= Bernhard Grill =

German electrical engineer (born 1961)

- Born: 5 January 1961 (age 65); Schwabach, West Germany
- Education: Friedrich-Alexander-University, Erlangen-Nuremberg
- Known for: MP3 format
- Awards: German Future Prize
- Scientific career
- Fields: Computer science
- Workplaces: Fraunhofer Institute for Integrated Circuits (IIS-A), Erlangen

Bernhard Grill (born 5 January 1961) is a German electrical engineer and one of the developers of the MP3 technology.

Grill was born in Schwabach and studied Electrical Engineering at the Friedrich-Alexander-University, Erlangen-Nuremberg. From 1988 to 1995 he engaged in the development and implementation of audio coding algorithms at the Fraunhofer Institute for Integrated Circuits IIS in Erlangen. In 1992 he received, together with Jürgen Herre and Ernst Eberlein, the "Joseph-von-Fraunhofer Award" for his contributions to the mp3 technology. In 2001, he received the German Future Prize jointly with Karlheinz Brandenburg and Harald Popp for their role as inventors of the mp3 compression format.

Grill was the original author of L3enc and WinPlay3, which were the first MP3 encoder and player for personal computers, respectively. He worked closely with Karlheinz Brandenburg in their development. This work was chronicled in the book "How Music Got Free".
