= Kid3 =

Tag editor

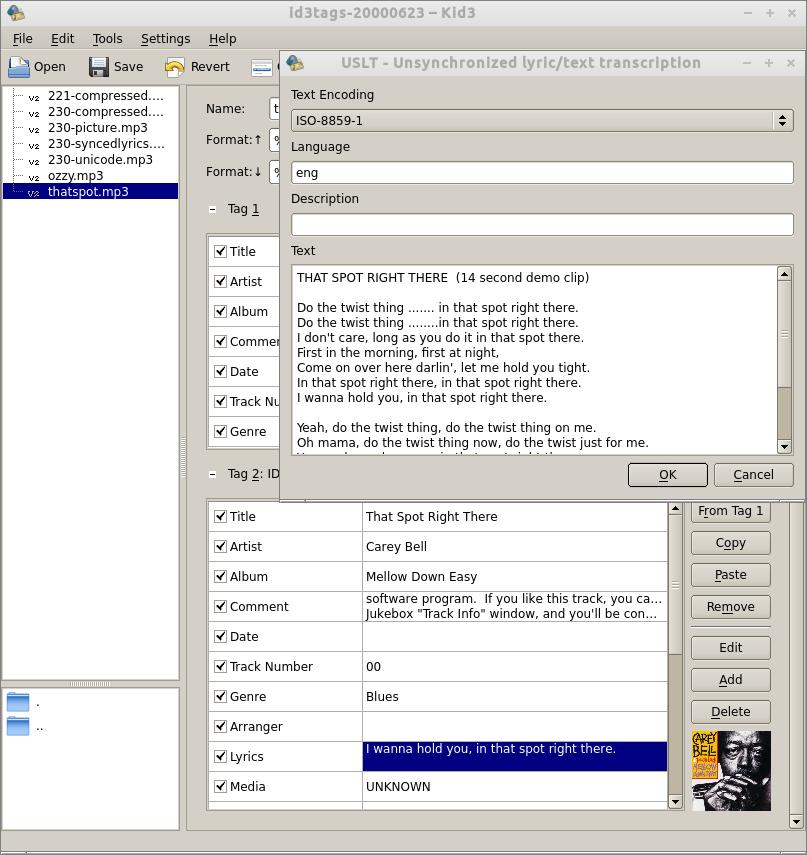
- Main window of Kid3 audio tagger
- Developer: Urs Fleisch
- Stable release: 3.10.0 (6 June 2026; 0 days ago) [±]
- Written in: C++
- Operating system: Android, FreeBSD, Mac OS X, Linux, Windows
- Available in: 34 languages
- List of languages Arabic, Basque, Brazilian Portuguese, British English, Catalan, Chinese (China), Chinese (Taiwan), Czech, Danish, Dutch, English, Esperanto, Estonian, Finnish, French, Galician, Georgian, German, Greek, Icelandic, Italian, Korean, Norwegian (Nynorsk), Polish, Portuguese, Russian, Serbian (Cyrillic script), Serbian (Latin script), Slovene, Spanish, Swedish, Turkish, Ukrainian, Valencian
- Type: Tag editor
- License: GNU General Public License
- Website: kid3.kde.org
- Repository: invent.kde.org/multimedia/kid3

Kid3 is an open-source cross-platform audio tag editor for many audio file formats. It supports DSF, MP3, Ogg, FLAC, MPC, MPEG-4 (mp4/m4a/m4b), AAC, Matroska, WebM, Opus, SPX, TrueAudio, APE, WavPack, WMA, WAV, AIFF, tracker modules.

== Features ==
- Edit and convert between ID3v1.1, ID3v2.3 and ID3v2.4 tags.
- Access to all tag fields.
- Batch edit tags of multiple files.
- Generate tags from filenames or from the contents of other tag fields.
- Generate filenames from tags, rename and create directories from tags.
- Generate playlist files.
- Automatically convert upper and lower case and replace strings.
- Search and filter files by tags.
- Import from gnudb.org, TrackType.org, MusicBrainz, Discogs, Amazon and other sources of album data.
- Automatic batch import of metadata and cover art for multiple albums from different sources.
- Import using acoustic fingerprints and AcoustID.
- Export tags as CSV, HTML, playlists, Kover XML and in other formats.

== See also ==
- List of tag editors
- ID3
- M3U
- List of KDE applications

== Bibliography ==
- von Hagen, William (2007). Ubuntu Linux Bible. John Wiley & Sons. p. 496. ISBN 978-0-470-12454-3.
- Яремчук, Сергей Акимович (2008). 200 лучших программ для Linux [200 best programs for Linux] (in Russian). Издательский дом "Питер". p. 165. ISBN 978-5-388-00068-2.
- Kofler, Michael (2011). Linux 2011 (in German). Pearson Deutschland GmbH. p. 235. ISBN 978-3-827-33025-3.
- Kofler, Michael (2014). Linux - Das umfassende Handbuch [Linux - The Definitive Guide] (in German). Galileo Press, Bonn. p. 313. ISBN 978-3-8362-2591-5.
- Schmidt, Jürgen (2005). "MP3-Tags grafisch anpassen". c't (in German) (9). Heise: 181.
- Reich, Karsten (2008). "Nachregeln". EasyLinux (in German) (2). Linux New Media AG: 64.
- Hansen, Sven (2008). "Multimediale Give-aways". c't (in German) (13). Heise: 145. Archived from the original on 2016-03-07.
- Himmelein, Gerald (2009). "Vertaggt und zugenäht". c't (in German) (2). Heise: 149. Archived from the original on 2016-03-07.
- Gieselmann, Hartmut (2009). "Für Augen und Ohren". c't (in German) (13). Heise: 114.
- "Musik". Com! Das Computer-Magazin (in German) (10). Neue Mediengesellschaft Ulm mbH: 98. 2011.
- Feist, Roland (2012). "20 unbekannte Software-Perlen". PC-Welt (in German) (2). International Data Group. Archived from the original on 2014-01-04.
- "Kid3 – Audio-Tag-Editor mit Internet-Anbindung". EasyLinux (in German) (1). Linux New Media AG: 16. 2013.
- Dölle, Mirko (2014). "Zurückgeholt". c't (in German). 2014 (24). Heise: 159. Archived from the original on 2015-07-12.
- Tolstoy, Alexander (2015). "LXFHotPicks Audio tool Kid3". Linux Format (200). Future plc: 59.
- Tolstoy, Alexander (2016). "LXFHotPicks Sound application Kid3". Linux Format (211). Future plc: 57.
- Kreußel, Peter (2017). "Kid3 3.4.3 – Audio-Tag-Editor". EasyLinux (in German) (4). Linux New Media AG: 20.
- Kreußel, Peter (2018). "Kid3 3.6.1 – handlicher Audiotag-Editor". EasyLinux (in German) (10). Linux New Media AG: 24.
- Peers, Nick (2021). "How to tag your media with Kid3". APC (magazine) (489). Future Australia: 101.
- Rupp, Michael (2021). "ID3-Tags bearbeiten". PC Magazin (in German) (10). Weka Group: 54.
- "Práctico, Sofware imprescindible, Descubre más software". Computer Hoy (in Spanish) (633). Axel Springer SE: 46. 2023.
- Power, Bill (2024). "Tag audio files after converting them". Computeractive (681). Future plc: 40.
- Möller, Christian (2025). "Die ideale Software". AUDIO+stereoplay (in German) (1). Weka Group: 77.
