= EasyTag =

Tag editor

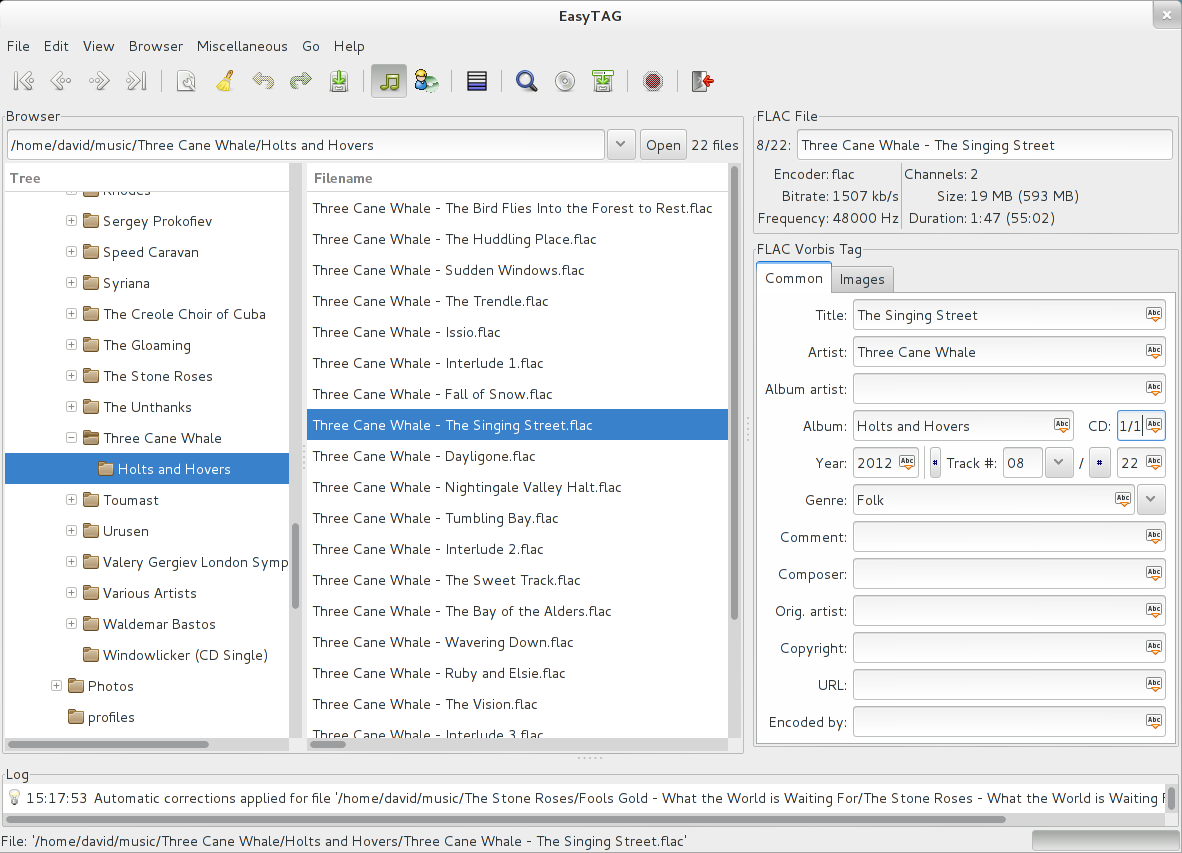
- Screenshot of EasyTag 2.1.9
- Original author(s): Jérôme Couderc
- Developer(s): David King
- Initial release: May 2000; 24 years ago
- Stable release: 2.4.3 / 5 December 2016; 8 years ago
- Repository: gitlab.gnome.org/GNOME/easytag
- Written in: C and GTK+
- Operating system: Windows and Linux
- Type: Tag editor
- License: GPLv2+
- Website: wiki.gnome.org/Apps/EasyTAG

EasyTag (stylised as EasyTAG) is a free and open-source graphical tag editor that is part of the GNOME project. EasyTag runs on Linux and Microsoft Windows, and there was an attempt to bring EasyTAG to OS X circa 2014. It is written in C and relies on GTK+ and id3lib for graphics and ID3 tag handling respectively. As of version 2.1.1, EasyTag also uses the tag manipulation library provided by the MAD project, for support of ID3v2.4.

EasyTag is free and open-source software subject to the terms of the GNU General Public License version 2 or any later version.

== Features ==
- Supported formats: MP3, MP2, FLAC, Opus, Speex, Ogg Vorbis, MP4, MPC, APE and WavPack
- Available tag fields (depending on format): Title, Artist, Album, Disc Album, Year, Track Number, Genre, Comment, Composer, Original Artist, Copyright, URL, Encoder and Picture
- Automated tagging using presets and custom masks
- Rename files using tag information or external text files
- Apply changes in a field (Artist, Album...) to all selected files
- Read and display file header information (bitrate, time...)
- CDDB support
- Tree based browser or a view by artist and album
- Recursion into subdirectories
- Playlist generator
- Undo/redo function

== See also ==
- List of tag editors
- ID3
- M3U
