= Games Convention =

Former annual video game event

Coordinates: 51°23′48″N 12°24′14″E

- Status: Inactive
- Genre: Video games
- Locations: Leipzig, Germany
- Country: Germany
- Inaugurated: 2002
- Most recent: 2008 (online until 2010)
- Attendance: 203,000 (2008)
- Organizer: Leipziger Messe, Bundesverband für Interaktive Unterhaltungssoftware

The Games Convention (GC), sometimes called the Leipzig Games Convention, was an annual video game event held in Leipzig, Germany, first held in 2002. Besides video games, the event also covers Infotainment, Hardware, and Edutainment. Its concept was created by the Leipziger Messe (Leipzig Fair) in cooperation with Bundesverband für Interaktive Unterhaltungssoftware (German Federal Association for Entertainment Software) amongst others. The 2010 Gamescon was held 18 to 22 August.

With 183,000 visitors, 2,600 journalists, and 368 exhibitors from 25 countries in 2006, the Games Convention was the second biggest gaming event in the world, together with the Tokyo Game Show, later only superseded by Gamescom, which is also held in Germany. By comparison, both the Leipzig and Tokyo shows, where gamers of all ages could visit the show floor, are three times the size of the trade-only 2006 E3 show in Los Angeles. The Business Centre at Leipzig was reserved for professional visitors. In 2008, the Games Convention had a record of 203,000 visitors. The conference took place in a sprawling modern complex of exhibition halls in Leipzig.

To help identify younger visitors, coloured bracelets were handed out to attendees, indicating their age: "12 years and older" (green), "16 years and older" (blue), and "18 years and older" (red). These colours corresponded to the age indicators used by the USK, the German version of PEGI or ESRB.

In April 2011, it was announced that GCO 2011 would not take place.

== History ==
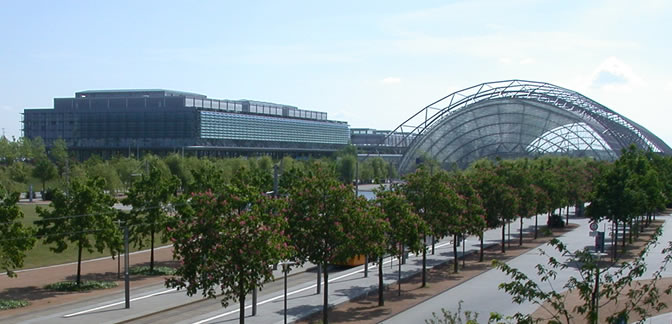
The western wings and central hall of the new Leipziger Messe Fairgrounds. The east wings and business centre are off-camera to the right. The central hall alone has been described as being large enough to enclose a World Cup football pitch.

The Leipzig Games Convention was first held in 2002. In 2005, the convention achieved visitor numbers of 134,000, which had risen to 185,000 by 2007.

The Games Convention was usually held in the last week of August. The Games Convention 2007 took place from 23 to 26 August 2007. It started one day earlier for press members, exhibitors, and professionals.

In 2008, the Industry consortium BIU announced not to back a Games Convention in 2009 in Leipzig, preferring a newly to be established convention held in Cologne under the name of Gamescom. Sony, Nintendo, and Microsoft are members of the BIU, representing 12 companies.

On 29 January 2009, the Leipziger Messe (Leipzig Fair) announced that in 2009 there would be no Games Convention as in 2008, but a new fair called "Games Convention Online" from 31 July to 2 August 2009. It featured mainly browser games and other online and casual games.

=== Asian expansion ===
An Asian edition of the Games Convention, called Games Convention Asia was first held in 2007. It was a yearly convention held in Singapore, starting on 6 September 2007. However, it has since become defunct as of 2010 when it was officially announced that the convention would no longer be held.

== Statistics ==
=== Games Convention ===
Year	Visitors	Exhibitors	Professional visitors	Journalists	Exhibition size
2002	80,000	166	3,000	750	30,000m²
2003	92,000	207	3,500	1,300	42,000m²
2004	105,000	258	4,200	1,700	55,000m²
2005	134,000	280	6,200	2,000	80,000m²
2006	183,000	367	7,000	2,400	90,000m²
2007	185,000	503	12,300	3,400	112,500m²
2008	203,000	547	14,600	3,800	115,000m²

=== Games Convention Online ===
Year	Visitors	Exhibitors	Professional visitors	Journalists	Exhibition size
2009	43,000	74	1,000	500	40,000m²
2010	-	-	630	-	-

== International Games Convention Developers Conference ==
The Games Convention Developers Conference (GCDC) was the largest game design and development conference in Europe, with 950 attendees in 2008.

The GCDC was held in a building in the same complex in Leipzig where the GC took place, typically just before the opening of the main show. During the conference attendees gained ideas and inspiration from the presentation of new tools and methods, and from a variety of sessions discussing both the craft and the business of game design and development. The conference was open to both game professionals, students and press.

As the major European conference, GCDC drew top speakers from all over the world. Presenters in recent years included Bob Bates, Louis Castle, Don Daglow, Peter Molyneux, Bill Roper, Bruce Shelley, David Perry and Will Wright.

=== Speakers ===
==== 2007 ====
Notable speakers from the GCDC 2007.

- Julian Eggebrecht, from Factor 5, United States
- Peter Molyneux, from Lionhead Studios, England
- Michael Capps, Mark Rein from Epic Games, United States
- Mark Morris, from Introversion Software, England
- Ken Rolston, from Big Huge Games, United States
- Cathy Campos, from Panache, England
- Doug Whatley, from BreakAway, United States
- Michael Lewis, from Cryptic Studios, United States
- George Bain, England
- Christopher Schmitz, from 10Tacle Studios, Germany
- Michael Wimmer, from The University of Vienna, Austria
- Alexander Fernández, from Streamline Studios, Netherlands
- Amir Taaki, from Crystal Space, England
- Jeff Strain, from ArenaNet, United States
- Vlad Ihora, from Telia Sonera, Sweden
- Barbara Lippe, from Avaloop, Austria
- Pamela Kato, from The GamerX, United States
- Uwe Nikl, from Level 3, England
- Matt Firor, from Ultra Mega Games, United States
- Konstantin Ewald, from Osborne Clark, Germany
- John Smedley, from Sony Online Entertainment, United States
- Cindy Armstrong, from Webzen, United States
- Jennifer MacLean, from Comcast Interactive Media, United States
- Chris Mottes, from Deadline Games, Denmark
- Jeff Hickman, from EA Mythic, United States
- Jeffrey Steefel, from Turbine, Inc., United States
- Don Daglow, from Stormfront Studios, United States
- Matt Firor from the United States
- Jason Manley, from Massive Black, United States
- Patric Palm, from Hansoft, Sweden
- Jonathan Wendel, from Fata1ity, United States

==== 2008 ====
- David Perry, from Acclaim Games, United States
- Cevat Yerli, from Crytek, Germany
- Mike Capps, from Epic Games, United States
- Paul Barnett, from Mythic Entertainment, United States

== Press day and press conferences ==
The Games Convention opened for professional visitors, such as developers and members of the press, one day before the event opened to the public. Many developers and publishers held official press conferences on this day.

== Symphonic Game Music Concert ==
As part of the Games Convention, on the evening of the first day of the Games Convention, a grand Symphonic Game Music Concert was held in the Leipzig Gewandhaus. Well-known game music composers such as Nobuo Uematsu, Michiru Yamane, Akira Yamaoka, Jason Hayes, Rob Hubbard, Chris Hülsbeck and Yuzo Koshiro were among those who have attended.

== European Nations Championship ==
The European Nations Championship has taken place since 2004. It is a national team competition, where it determines which European nation has the best e-athletes. The ENC holds events in Counter-Strike, Counter-Strike: Source, Warcraft III, FIFA, Call of Duty 4, and DotA. The final takes place every year in August at the Games Convention in Leipzig, Germany.

ESL European National Championship
Discipline	Winner	Second	Third
2004
Counter-Strike	Sweden	Austria	Germany
Warcraft III	Sweden	France	Denmark
2005
Counter-Strike	Germany	Bulgaria	Austria
Warcraft III	Sweden	France	Germany
FIFA	Germany	Russia	Austria
UT 2004	Germany	Netherlands	Sweden
2006
Counter-Strike	Sweden	Norway	Poland
Warcraft III	Sweden	Bulgaria	Germany
FIFA	Germany	Hungary	Russia
2007
Counter-Strike	Poland	Germany	Denmark
Warcraft III	Finland	Sweden	Germany
FIFA	Germany	Ukraine	Hungary
2008
Counter-Strike	Sweden	Germany	Denmark
Warcraft III	Germany	Finland	Sweden
FIFA	Poland	Germany	Romania
Counter-Strike: Source	Czech Republic	France	Slovenia
2009
Counter-Strike	Sweden	Germany	Poland
Warcraft III	Denmark	Netherlands	Germany
FIFA	Germany	Ukraine	Austria
Counter-Strike: Source	Germany	France	Italy
Call of Duty 4: Modern Warfare	Germany	Finland	Poland
DotA	Ukraine	Romania	Bulgaria

Perpetual Medal
Space	Land	Gold	Silver	Bronze	Total
1.	Germany	9	4	5	18
2.	Sweden	7	1	2	10
3.	Poland	2	0	3	5
4.	Finland	1	2	0	3
5.	Czech Republic	1	0	0	1
6.	Bulgaria	0	2	1	3
7.	France	0	3	0	3
8.	Austria	0	1	3	4
9.	Russia	0	1	1	2
10.	Hungary	0	1	1	2
11.	Netherlands	0	2	0	2
12.	Norway	0	1	0	1
13.	Ukraine	1	2	0	3
14.	Denmark	1	0	3	4
15.	Romania	0	0	1	1
16.	Slovenia	0	0	1	1

== See also ==
- Leipziger Messe
- Gamescom
- Tokyo Game Show
- Brasil Game Show
- Gamercom
- E3
- Penny Arcade Expo
- Entertainment for All
