= International Game Developers Conference =

The term International Game Developers Conference could mean:

- Game Developers Conference, an industry-only event started in 1988, held in northern California, with ties to the IGDA (International Game Developers Association)
- Games Convention, an open-to-the-public tradeshow held in Leipzig, Germany, which as part of its activities has a smaller game developer conference called the International Games Developer Conference
