= E4 =

E4, E.IV or E-4 may refer to:

== Entertainment ==
- E4 (TV channel), a television channel in the United Kingdom and Ireland
- Every Extend Extra Extreme, a video game from Q Entertainment
- Entertainment for All, a video game expo

== Transportation ==
- Aero Asia International, an airline, by IATA code

=== Roads ===
- Central Expressway (Sri Lanka), numbered E04
- European route E4, a road through Finland and Sweden
- E4 European long distance path, a European long-distance trail
- Tōhoku Expressway, route E4 in Japan
- E4 expressway (Pakistan)
- South Kedah Expressway in Malaysia
- Subic Freeport Expressway in the Philippines

=== Trains ===
- E4 Series Shinkansen, a Japanese high-speed train
- CNW Class E-4, a 4-6-4 steam locomotive of the Chicago & Northwestern Railway
- EMC E4, a diesel locomotive
- LB&SCR E4 class, a steam locomotive of the London, Brighton & South Coast Railway
- LNER E4 Class, a 2-4-0 steam locomotive built by the Great Eastern Railway and operated by the LNER

== Military ==
- Boeing E-4, a U.S. military flying command post
- Fokker E.IV, a 1915 German fighter aircraft
- E4, the fourth enlisted rank in the Military of the United States, including:
  - Petty officer third class in the United States Navy and United States Coast Guard
  - Senior airman in the United States Air Force (Sergeant until 1976)
  - Specialist (rank) in the United States Army (if the soldier is not a non-commissioned officer)
  - Corporal in the United States Army and United States Marine Corps (if the soldier is a non-commissioned officer)

== Science and technology ==
- E4-isoprostane, a type of isoprostane
- Leukotriene E4, a naturally produced eicosanoid lipid mediator
- E-4 process, an obsolete development process associated with photographic transparency film
- Honda E4, a predecessor of Honda's ASIMO robot
- RCS-4, a synthetic cannabinoid sold as "E-4"
- E4 or E_{4}, an old name for the exceptional group F_{4}
- Estetrol, an estrogen

== Other uses ==
- Big Four (Western Europe), sometimes called 'E4', a group of powerful countries in Europe
- E4, a postcode district in the E postcode area
- King's Pawn Game, or 1. e4, a chess opening move
- E4 grade, a grade of difficulty in rock climbing
- E4 or E_{4}, musical notation indicating the E above Middle C

== See also ==
- 4E (disambiguation)
- EIV (disambiguation)
