= 4E =

4E or 4e or 4-E may refer to:

== People ==
- Forrest J Ackerman or 4e (1916–2008), American science fiction fan and collector

== Art, entertainment, and media ==
- 4E TV, a Greek TV station based in Thessaloniki
- GURPS 4e Basic Set, an edition of the GURPS role-playing system
- NJS4E (New Jack Swing For Ever), a company, network, events, and on-air programming honoring new jack swing
- The 4th edition of Dungeons & Dragons, abbreviated as 4E
- 4E, the production code for the 1975 Doctor Who serial Genesis of the Daleks

== Other uses ==
- 4E cognition, view of cognition of the extended mind thesis
- 4th meridian east, a longitude coordinate
- Het 4e Gymnasium, a public gymnasium in the Netherlands
- Potez 4E, a French air-cooled flat-four piston engine of the 1960s
- Sedan 4E, a variation of the McCulloch MC-4 helicopter

== See also ==
- Douglas DC-4E, an American experimental airliner developed before World War II
- E4 (disambiguation)
- eIF4E, Eukaryotic translation initiation factor 4E, a protein
