= Chris Mottes =

- Born: Denmark
- Occupation: CEO of Deadline Games

Chris Mottes was the chief executive officer of Deadline Games, a now-defunct game development group in Denmark. He is responsible for overseeing games like Chili Con Carnage and Total Overdose.

He started the games development group after running an underground television network with a friend.

His company's best selling game was Total Overdose, which was released for Xbox, PlayStation 2 and Microsoft Windows, and published by SCi games.
