= Harald Popp =

German electrical engineer (born 1956)

- Born: 30 September 1956 (age 69); Erlangen, West Germany
- Education: University of Erlangen-Nuremberg
- Known for: MP3 format
- Awards: German Future Prize
- Scientific career
- Fields: Computer science
- Workplaces: Fraunhofer Institute for Integrated Circuits (IIS-A), Erlangen

Harald Popp (born 30 September 1956 in Erlangen) is a German electrical engineer. Together with Karlheinz Brandenburg, Ernst Eberlein, Heinz Gerhäuser (former Institutes Director of Fraunhofer IIS), Bernhard Grill, Jürgen Herre (all Fraunhofer IIS) and others, he developed the widespread MP3 method for audio data compression.

== Biography ==
=== Education ===
1975 Popp graduated with the Abitur (International Baccalaureate Diploma). Popp was educated at Friedrich-Alexander-University (FAU), Nuremberg, where he studied electrical engineering from 1975 to 1981 and obtained a graduate Diploma.

=== Profession ===
From 1982 to 1984 Popp worked on a technology transfer project for cable fault location of the Friedrich-Alexander-University Erlangen-Nürnberg. 1985 he became researcher at the Fraunhofer Institute for Integrated Circuits (IIS-A) in Erlangen. From 1985 to 1990 was Popp development engineer for digital circuits on board-level. 1987 he started with the development of multi-DSP based real-time audio coding systems. Since 1987, he has been responsible for DSP-based real-time audio coding systems. 1990 he began with the development of studio audio codecs ("ASPEC 91") for high-quality sound transmission over ISDN telephone lines. From 1990 to 1994 he worked as Head of Hardware Group in the Information Electronics Department. From 1995 to 1997 he was Head of the video group in the Audio & Multimedia department and 1998 - 2003 Head of the Studio Department. Since 2004 until 2018 he was Head of Multimedia Real-Time Systems, with a focus on developing effective real-time implementations of audio and video coding.

From 1986 to 1995, Popp contributed to the development of the MP3 Audio coding format together with Karlheinz Brandenburg and Bernhard Grill. For his contribution to this work he was awarded the German Future Prize.

== Private life and hobbies ==
In his free time, Harald Popp works with his wife Isolde as the author of the fantasy role-playing game Midgard. Together they have two sons.

== Bibliography ==
- Isolde & Harald Popp: Der Ruf des Roten Raben Franke, Elsa; Auflage: 1., 1993, ISBN 978-3924714185
- M. Dietz, H. Popp, K. Brandenburg and R. Friedrich: Audio Compression for Network Transmission, Journal of the AES, Vol. 44, No. 1-2, 1996.
- Isolde & Harald Popp: Midgard-Abenteuer: Der weiße Wurm Pegasus Spiele, 1998, ISBN 978-3930635573
- K. Brandenburg and H. Popp: An introduction to MPEG Layer-3, Fraunhofer Institut für Integrierte Schaltungen (IIS), EBU Technical Review, 2000, online
- Isolde & Harald Popp: Midgard-Abenteuer: Die Straße zur Hölle part 1, Stelzenberg: Elsa Franke, Verlag für F&SF-Spiele, 2011, ISBN 978-3-924714-35-2
- Isolde & Harald Popp: Midgard-Abenteuer: Die Treppe zum Himmel part 2, Stelzenberg: Elsa Franke, Verlag für F&SF-Spiele, 2011, ISBN 978-3924714369
- Isolde & Harald Popp: Unter dem Schirm des Jadekaisers, Pegasus Spiele Gmbh, 2005, ISBN 978-3930635917

== See also ==
- German inventors and discoverers
- How Music Got Free
