= Mp3tag =

Tag editor for Microsoft Windows and Apple macOS

- Original author: Florian Heidenreich
- Release: before 2003
- Stable release: v3.36.1 / August 29, 2026; 2 months ago
- Preview release: v3.36.1 / August 29, 2026; 2 months ago
- Written in: C++
- Operating system: Windows and macOS
- Size: 4.21 MiB (32-bit); 4.65 MiB (64-bit) for stable release version
- Available in: 39 languages
- List of languages Belarusian, Bulgarian, Catalan, Chinese (simplified), Chinese (traditional), Corsican, Croatian, Czech, Danish, Dutch, English, Farsi, Finnish, French, Galician, German, Greek, Hebrew, Hungarian, Italian, Japanese, Korean, Lithuanian, Macedonian, Norwegian, Polish, Portuguese, Portuguese (Brazilian), Romanian, Russian, Serbian (Cyrillic), Serbian (Latin), Slovak, Slovenian, Spanish, Swedish, Turkish, Ukrainian, Vietnamese
- Type: Tag editor
- License: Proprietary
- Website: mp3tag.de/en

Mp3tag is a metadata tag editor that supports many popular audio file formats. It is freeware for Microsoft Windows, while it is a paid application for Apple macOS in the Mac App Store.

== Features ==
Mp3tag has the following features:

- Batch Tag Editing. Write ID3v1.1, ID3v2.3, ID3v2.4, MPEG-4, WMA, APEv2 tags, and Vorbis comments to multiple files at once.
- Full Unicode support
- Support for embedded album cover art
- Automatically creates playlists
- Recursive subfolder support
- User-defined field mappings
- Remove parts of a tag or the entire tag from multiple files
- Rename files based on the tag information
- Import tags from filenames and text files
- Format tags and filenames
- Replace characters or words from tags and filenames
- Regular expressions
- Export tag information to user-defined formats (i.e. HTML, RTF, CSV, XML and TXT)
- Import tag information from online databases like freedb, discogs, MusicBrainz or Amazon (also by text-search)
- Import tag information from local freedb databases
- Support for ID3v2.3 (ISO-8859-1 and UTF-16) and ID3v2.4 with UTF-8

It includes support for the following audio formats:

- Advanced Audio Coding (.aac)
- Apple Lossless Audio Codec (.alac)
- Audio Interchange File Format (.aif/.aifc/.aiff)
- Direct Stream Digital Audio (.dsf)
- Free Lossless Audio Codec (.flac)
- Matroska (.mka/.mkv)
- Monkey's Audio (.ape)
- MPEG Layer 3 (.mp3)
- MPEG-4 (.mp4/.m4a/.m4b/.m4v)
- Musepack (.mpc)
- Ogg Vorbis (.ogg)
- IETF Opus (.opus)
- OptimFROG (.ofr/.ofs)
- Speex (.spx)
- Tom's Audio Kompressor (.tak)
- True Audio (.tta)
- Windows Media Audio (.wma)
- WavPack (.wv)
- WAV (.wav)
- WebM (.webm)

== Playlist example ==
The following is an example of an M3U playlist file for "Jar of Flies" album by "Alice in Chains" that was created by Mp3tag with the following custom option settings:

- playlist extended info format = "%artist% - %title%"
- playlist filename format = "%artist%_%album%_00_Playlist.m3u"
- tag to filename conversion format = "%artist%_%album%_$num(%track%,2)_%title%"

#EXTM3U
#EXTINF:419,Alice in Chains - Rotten Apple
Alice in Chains_Jar of Flies_01_Rotten Apple.mp3
#EXTINF:260,Alice in Chains - Nutshell
Alice in Chains_Jar of Flies_02_Nutshell.mp3
#EXTINF:255,Alice in Chains - I Stay Away
Alice in Chains_Jar of Flies_03_I Stay Away.mp3
#EXTINF:256,Alice in Chains - No Excuses
Alice in Chains_Jar of Flies_04_No Excuses.mp3
#EXTINF:157,Alice in Chains - Whale And Wasp
Alice in Chains_Jar of Flies_05_Whale And Wasp.mp3
#EXTINF:263,Alice in Chains - Don't Follow
Alice in Chains_Jar of Flies_06_Don't Follow.mp3
#EXTINF:245,Alice in Chains - Swing On This
Alice in Chains_Jar of Flies_07_Swing On This.mp3
