= How Music Got Free =

Non-fiction book by Stephen Witt

How Music Got Free: The End of an Industry, the Turn of the Century, and the Patient Zero of Piracy
- Author: Stephen Richard Witt
- Language: English
- Genre: Non-fiction
- Publisher: Viking
- Publication date: June 16, 2015
- Publication place: United States of America
- Pages: 296
- ISBN: 978-0-525-42661-5
- Dewey Decimal: 381'.45780266-dc23
- LC Class: ML3790.W59 2015
- Website: http://stephenwittbooks.com/books/how-music-got-free-hc

How Music Got Free: The End of an Industry, the Turn of the Century, and the Patient Zero of Piracy (also published as How Music Got Free: What Happens When an Entire Generation Commits the Same Crime?, How Music Got Free: The Inventor, The Mogul and the Thief, and How Music Got Free: A Story of Obsession and Invention) is a non-fiction book by journalist Stephen Witt. The book chronicles the invention of the MP3 format for audio information, detailing the efforts by researchers such as Karlheinz Brandenburg, Bernhard Grill and Harald Popp to analyze human hearing and successfully compress songs in a form that can be easily transmitted. Witt also documents the rise of the warez scene and spread of copyright-infringing efforts online while detailing the campaigns by music industry executives such as Doug Morris to adapt to changing technology.

The publisher Viking distributed the work on June 16, 2015. The book has received praise from publications such as Kirkus Reviews and The Washington Post.

== Background and book contents ==
The book notes that, at a presentation to the Fraunhofer Society, Brandenburg and his team's presentation of the technology that could re-create the fidelity of a recording on a CD at one-twelfth the size created a stir. "Do you realize what you’ve done?" asked a listener to the team. "You’ve killed the music industry!"

"On websites and underground file servers across the world," Witt states, "the number of mp3 files in existence grew by several orders of magnitude. In dorm rooms everywhere incoming college freshmen found their hard drives filled to capacity with pirated mp3s". He also writes, "Music piracy became to the late ’90s what drug experimentation was to the late ’60s: a generation-wide flouting of both social norms and the existing body of law, with little thought of consequences." The book recounts how many people wound up building massive archives of music for little other than the thrill created by finding and sorting the information.

Witt writes about the obscure online community known as 'The Scene', particularly describing the efforts of the Rabid Neurosis (RNS) group to illegally spread copyrighted material. A North Carolina manufacturing plant employee named Dell Glover, his life described in detail by Witt, discovers that he has the ability to get his hands on albums before their official release dates and goes on to work with RNS leaking hundreds upon hundreds of discs. Artists such as Mary J. Blige, Mariah Carey, Eminem, Kanye West, and Jay Z have their material distributed online due to Glover's actions. Witt states that Glover and RNS became the world’s premier music pirates, possibly costing the record industry millions of dollars.

The book describes how the then CEO of Universal Music Group, Doug Morris, attempted to weather the storm created by technological changes given the evolution of social culture. Witt comments that "the uniform blandness of the corporate sound wasn’t helping" and gives a mixed picture as to how Morris and other executives dealt with falling sales.

== Reviews and responses ==
The Washington Post published an article by writer Louis Bayard praising the book, with Bayard commenting that he found the work "whip-smart, superbly reported, and indispensable". Bayard additionally stated that technology has created a period of "uneasy times, and no one should go too easy on himself", finding the recent trends troubling himself. Kirkus Reviews ran a praising response to the book, with it labeled as a "propulsive and fascinating portrait of the people who helped upend an industry and challenge how music and media are consumed".

== Documentary ==
In June 2024, a two-part documentary based on Witt's book was released. Directed by Alex Stapleton, it features interviews with musical artists Eminem, Timbaland, and former record executive Jimmy Iovine.

The Guardian reviewer writes: "Today, everyone knows just how bad a thing that turned out to be for the music industry, nearly destroying it by the early 2000s. What most people don't know, however, is the story behind the people who created the technology that made this revolution possible, as well as the group of kids who first figured out how to use its tools so enticingly. That’s the tale told by a thought-provoking and highly entertaining new docuseries titled How Music Got Free."

== See also ==
- 2015 in literature
- Data compression of audio
- Legal aspects of file-sharing
- Music industry
- Music piracy
