= M3U =

Computer file format for a multimedia playlist

- Filename extensions: .m3u, .m3u8
- Internet media type: various;
- Initial release: c. 1996
- Type of format: Playlist
- Extended to: HLS playlist

VLC file in .m3u format

M3U (MP3 URL) is a computer file format for a multimedia playlist. One common use of the M3U file format is creating a single-entry playlist file pointing to a stream on the Internet. The created file provides easy access to that stream and is often used in downloads from a website, for emailing, and for listening to Internet radio.

Although originally designed for audio files, such as MP3, it is commonly used to point media players to audio and video sources, including online sources. M3U was originally developed by Fraunhofer for use with their WinPlay3 software, but numerous media players and software applications now support the format.

Careless handling of M3U playlists has been the cause of vulnerabilities in many music players such as VLC media player, iTunes, Winamp, and many others.

== File format ==
There is no formal specification for the M3U format; it is a de facto standard.

An M3U file is a plain text file that specifies the locations of one or more media files. The file is saved with the m3u filename extension if the text is encoded in the local system's default non-Unicode encoding (e.g., a Windows codepage), or with the m3u8 extension if the text is UTF-8 encoded. The mp3url extension was originally supported by Winplay3, but fell out of use.

Each entry carries one specification. The specification can be any one of the following:

- an absolute local pathname; e.g., C:\My Music\Heavysets.mp3
- a local pathname relative to the M3U file location; e.g. Heavysets.mp3
- a URL

Each entry ends with a line break which separates it from the following one. Furthermore, some devices only accept line breaks represented as CR LF, but do not recognize a single LF.

=== Extended M3U ===
The M3U file can also include comments, prefaced by the # character. In extended M3U, # also introduces extended M3U directives which are terminated by a colon : if they support parameters.

M3U extensions
Directive	Description	Example	Required	Standard
#EXTM3U	file header, must be the first line of the file	#EXTM3U	1×	Yes
#EXTINF:	track information: runtime in seconds, then optional display title of the following resource. For runtime, a length of -1 or 0 may be used when media is a streaming file with no predefined length.	#EXTINF:123,Artist Name – Track Title␤ artist - title.mp3	No	Yes
#EXTINF:	additional properties as key-value pairs	#EXTINF:123 logo="cover.jpg",Stream Title␤ http://example.org/live.strm	No	IPTV
#PLAYLIST:	playlist display title	#PLAYLIST:Music TV	1×	IPTV
#EXTGRP:	begin named grouping	#EXTGRP:Foreign Channels	No	IPTV
#EXTALB:	album information, title in particular	#EXTALB:Album Title (2009)	1×	AL, M3A
#EXTART:	album artist	#EXTART:Various	1×	AL, M3A
#EXTGENRE:	album genre	#EXTGENRE:Jazz Fusion	1×	AL
#EXTM3A	playlist for tracks or chapters of an album in a single file	#EXTM3A	1×	M3A
#EXTBYT:	file size in bytes	#EXTBYT:34124	No	M3A
#EXTBIN:	binary data follows, usually concatenated MP3s	#EXTBIN:	No	M3A
#EXTALBUMARTURL:	URL of album art image	#EXTALBUMARTURL:https://example.com/a1b2c3d4.jpg	No	Jamendo/VLC
#EXTVLCOPT:	set VLC option; syntax is of the form option-name=value	#EXTVLCOPT:start-time=32.5	No	VLC

=== M3U8 ===
The use of UTF-8 encoding is mandatory in M3U playlists with the M3U8 file extension. The system codepage is usually assumed for .m3u but this is often UTF-8 as well nowadays so the distinction has mostly been lost in practice.

=== HLS ===
Apple used the extended M3U format, UTF-8 encoded, as a base for their HTTP Live Streaming (HLS) which was documented in an Independent Submission Stream RFC in 2017 as RFC 8216. Therein, a master playlist references segment playlists which usually contain URLs for short parts of the media stream. Some tags only apply to the former type and some only to the latter type of playlist, but they all begin with #EXT-X-.

HLS M3U extensions
Directive	Example	Description
#EXT-X-START:	TIME-OFFSET=0	
#EXT-X-INDEPENDENT-SEGMENTS	Toggle without parameters	
#EXT-X-PLAYLIST-TYPE:	VOD or EVENT	
#EXT-X-TARGETDURATION:	10	The maximum Media Segment duration in seconds
#EXT-X-VERSION:	4	
#EXT-X-MEDIA-SEQUENCE:	0	The Media Sequence Number of the first Media Segment appearing in the playlist file
#EXT-X-MEDIA:	NAME="English", TYPE=AUDIO, GROUP-ID="audio-stereo-64", LANGUAGE="en", DEFAULT=YES, AUTOSELECT=YES, URI="english.m3u8"	
#EXT-X-STREAM-INF:	BANDWIDTH=1123000, CODECS="avc1.64001f,mp4a.40.2"	Parameters have either one combined value or one per stream, separated by commas
#EXT-X-BYTERANGE:	1024@256000	
#EXT-X-DISCONTINUITY	toggle without parameters	The segment represents the start of a new period
#EXT-X-DISCONTINUITY-SEQUENCE:	2	Indicates start of numbering of periods
#EXT-X-GAP	toggle without parameters	The segment represents a "spacer" before a new period
#EXT-X-KEY:	METHOD=NONE	Indicates encryption method used and decryption key
#EXT-X-MAP:	URI=MediaInitializationSection	
#EXT-X-PROGRAM-DATE-TIME:	2010-02-19T14:54:23.031+08:00	ISO 8601 format
#EXT-X-DATERANGE:	ID=foo	
#EXT-X-I-FRAMES-ONLY	i-frame Toggle without parameters	
#EXT-X-SESSION-DATA:	DATA-ID=com.example.movie.title	
#EXT-X-SESSION-KEY:		
#EXT-X-ENDLIST	End-of-list signal without parameters	

=== IPTV ===
With television broadcasting via the internet protocol (IPTV), M3U playlists are frequently used to store the (start) URLs of the streams, so each entry represents a channel. As usual for continuous streams, the length info directly after #EXTINF: is set to -1. Unlike HLS, other structured information is not provided in separate info lines but with a key–value syntax before the mandatory comma following the length.

#EXTINF:-1 tvg-id="123" tvg-name="Channel Name" tvg-logo="http://example.com/logo.png" group-title="Examples", Channel Name
rtsp://example.com/stream

IPTV #EXTINF length value extensions
Attribute	Example	Description
Group	group-title="News"	named (thematic) group of channels, i.e. a genre
Group	tvg-group="Music/Rock"	named group of channels, some players support a hierarchical separator within the value
Logo	tvg-logo="/logos/channel.png"	URL to channel logo image file
Name	tvg-name="Channel TV"	usually the same name repeated after the comma, but can differ to match display-name in XMLTV
Number	tvg-chno="12"	channel number
CUID	tvg-id="1234"	unique identifier to link EPG info with (e.g. using channel-id in XMLTV)
Country	tvg-country="NZ"	origin country of the channel, possibly using ISO 3166 codes
Language	tvg-language="English"	main audio language of the channel, possibly using ISO 639 codes
Radio	radio=true	boolean value to mark audio-only channels

== Internet media types ==
The only Internet media type registered for M3U and M3U8 is application/vnd.apple.mpegurl, registered in 2009 and only referring to the playlist format as used in HLS applications.

The current proposal for the HLS playlist format acknowledges two media types which it treats as equivalent: application/vnd.apple.mpegurl and audio/mpegurl. Likewise, these are the two types recommended for HLS use by Microsoft.

For non-HLS applications, no media types were standardized or registered with the IANA, but a number of media types are nonetheless associated with the historical and ongoing use of the M3U and M3U8 formats for general playlists:

- application/mpegurl
- application/x-mpegurl
- audio/mpegurl
- audio/x-mpegurl

These types, plus application/vnd.apple.mpegurl and application/vnd.apple.mpegurl.audio, are supported for HLS applications by (for example) Microsoft's Windows 10 and Internet Explorer 9, and LG's WebOS.

== Example ==
The following is an example of an M3U playlist file for the Alice in Chains album Jar of Flies that was created by Mp3tag with the following custom option settings:

- playlist extended info format = "%artist% - %title%"
- playlist filename format = "%artist%_%album%_00_Playlist.m3u"
- tag to filename conversion format = "%artist%_%album%_$num(%track%,2)_%title%"

 #EXTM3U
 #EXTINF:419,Alice in Chains - Rotten Apple
 Alice in Chains_Jar of Flies_01_Rotten Apple.mp3
 #EXTINF:260,Alice in Chains - Nutshell
 Alice in Chains_Jar of Flies_02_Nutshell.mp3
 #EXTINF:255,Alice in Chains - I Stay Away
 Alice in Chains_Jar of Flies_03_I Stay Away.mp3
 #EXTINF:256,Alice in Chains - No Excuses
 Alice in Chains_Jar of Flies_04_No Excuses.mp3
 #EXTINF:157,Alice in Chains - Whale And Wasp
 Alice in Chains_Jar of Flies_05_Whale And Wasp.mp3
 #EXTINF:263,Alice in Chains - Don't Follow
 Alice in Chains_Jar of Flies_06_Don't Follow.mp3
 #EXTINF:245,Alice in Chains - Swing On This
 Alice in Chains_Jar of Flies_07_Swing On This.mp3

== Software ==
=== Tag editors ===
The following tag editor software allows users to edit the ID3 tags in MP3 files, and has support for creating M3U files.

Linux

- Kid3, Puddletag.

Windows

- Mp3tag.

macOS

- Mp3tag.

=== Media players ===
The following media player software supports playing M3U files.

Multi-platform

Programs	Platforms				
Programs	Windows	macOS	Linux	Android	Other
Amarok	Yes	No	Yes	No	No
Audacious	Yes	No	Yes	No	No
Banshee	Yes	Yes	Yes	No	Yes
Clementine	Yes	Yes	Yes	No	Yes
foobar2000	Yes	Yes	No	Yes	Yes
iTunes	Yes	Yes	No	No	No
Kodi	Yes	Yes	Yes	Yes	Yes
make_playlist (mkpl)	Yes	Yes	Yes	No	No
MOC (Music on Console)	No	No	Yes	No	Yes
MPlayer	Yes	Yes	Yes	Yes	Yes
mpv	Yes	Yes	Yes	Yes	Yes
VLC media player	Yes	Yes	Yes	Yes	Yes

Android

- Astro Player, Kodi, N7Player, Musicolet

macOS

- Music, QuickTime Player, IINA

Nintendo

- New Nintendo 3DS (including XL and 2DS XL variants) with Internet Browser app
- Nintendo Switch with the YouTube (site-specific) app
- Wii U with the Internet Browser or YouTube app

Windows

- foobar2000, JRiver Media Center, JuK, MediaMonkey, PotPlayer, Winamp, Windows Media Player, XMPlay

== See also ==
- List of tag editors

Other playlist file formats

- PLS - SHOUTcast
