= Globetrotter 2 =

2001 video game

- Developer(s): Deadline Games
- Publisher(s): DNK: Vision Park; UK: Mindscape
- Platform(s): Windows
- Release: DNK: 2001; SWE: October 25, 2001; UK: 2004
- Genre(s): Educational, quiz

Globetrotter 2 is an educational game about geography by Deadline Games. It is a sequel to Globetrotter (2000). The player has to answer geographical questions in order to progress through the game and move to other countries and cities. Each city has its own set of questions.

== Reception ==
Reception

Review scores
Publication	Score
Jeuxvideo.com	12/20
Computeractive	4/5
Incite PC Games	8/10

Computeractive describes it as an "excellent learning tool for those planning a foreign trip or just hoping to pick up some general knowledge about the world around them." Incite PC Games called the game better than its predecessor. Jeuxvideo.com said the game is very similar to the first game.
