= L3enc =

Fraunhofer l3enc was the first public software able to encode pulse-code modulation (PCM) .wav files to the MP3 format. The first public version was released on July 13, 1994. This command-line tool was shareware and limited to 112 kbit/s. l3enc fit on a single 3.5" floppy. It was available for MS-DOS, Linux, Solaris, SunOS, NeXTstep and IRIX. A licence that allowed full use (encoding up to 320 kbit/s) cost 350 Deutsche Mark, or about $250 (US).

Fraunhofer l3dec was the first public software able to decode the MP3 format.

Since the release in September 1995 of Fraunhofer WinPlay3, the first real-time MP3 software player, people were able to store and play back MP3 files on PCs. WinPlay3 fit on a single 3.5" floppy. For full playback quality (stereo) one would have needed to meet the minimum requirements of a 486DX4/100 processor.

By the end of 1997 l3enc stopped being developed in favour of its successor MP3enc. Development of MP3enc stopped in late 1998 to favour development of a parallel branch FhG had been developing for some time, called Fastenc. None of these programs are still marketed.

== See also ==
- LAME – free software codec used to encode/compress .mp3 audio
