= Watchmen: The End Is Nigh =

- Developer: Deadline Games
- Publisher: Warner Bros. Interactive Entertainment
- Director: Søren Lund
- Producer: Søren Lund
- Writers: Peter Aperlo; Len Wein
- Composer: Tyler Bates
- Series: Watchmen
- Engine: Kapow
- Platforms: Microsoft Windows; PlayStation 3 Xbox 360
- Release: March 4, 2009: Download; WW: March 4, 2009 (Part 1; PC, X360); WW: March 5, 2009 (Part 1; PS3); WW: July 29, 2009 (Part 2; PC); WW: July 30, 2009 (Part 2; PS3); WW: August 26, 2009 (Part 2; X360) Disc version; NA: July 21, 2009; EU: July 24, 2009; AU: July 28, 2009 (PS3); AU: July 29, 2009 (X360)
- Genres: Action, beat 'em up
- Modes: Single-player, multiplayer

Watchmen: The End Is Nigh is an episodic video game that serves as a prequel to the film adaptation of the DC Comics limited series Watchmen. The game was originally announced for release in downloadable installments on Microsoft Windows, PlayStation Network, and Xbox Live Arcade, with the first one released in March 2009 to coincide with the film's theatrical release. The second episode was released in July and August 2009.

Both episodes were released together on disc on July 21, 2009, for Xbox 360 and PlayStation 3. A limited edition of the PlayStation 3 version was released billed as "The Complete Experience", which also included the extended Director's Cut version of the film in Blu-ray format.

== Gameplay ==
The game allows players to take on the roles of either Rorschach or Nite Owl in single player or cooperative multiplayer. Rorschach and Nite Owl are the only playable characters in the game's first episode, which comprises six "chapters." Cutscenes that look like animated comic panels, similar to those seen in the Watchmen motion comics released on iTunes, bookend each chapter. Two of the film's actors, Patrick Wilson and Jackie Earle Haley, provide their voices for their characters Nite Owl and Rorschach, respectively. The game features a mix of beat-em-up and puzzle gameplay, with the two characters having different strengths and abilities. Rorschach is faster with unconventional attacks and makes use of improvised weapons like crowbars and baseball bats; Nite Owl is slower but has a solid martial arts method and uses gadgets, such as "screecher bombs", and the grappling gun. Working together is essential to solving puzzles and defeating enemies.

The game is set in 1972 during the Crimebusters (for the film adaptation, The Watchmen) era. The first chapter of the game is a tutorial taking place while Rorschach and Nite Owl infiltrate a prison. Underboss, a villain mentioned in the comic book, appears in the game, as do other adversaries who are only mentioned or briefly shown in flashbacks in the original comic. Nite Owl's flying craft, Archimedes, appears, though the player never has control over it during the game.

An article on Comicmix.com emphasized the game's focus on teamwork between the two characters: in single-player mode, the AI controls the other character aside from the main character, while the game can be played in Local Co-op with two players as both characters. The article also mentioned there would be no online Co-op mode.

== Plot ==
The End Is Nigh takes place during the Crimebusters (renamed "Watchmen" for the film adaptation) era, when Rorschach and Nite Owl II were crime-fighting vigilantes before the Keene Act passed in 1977.

=== Part I ===
In 1972, upon hearing a police bulletin, Nite Owl and Rorschach make their way to Sing Sing prison to help quell the rioting that has erupted there.

When they get there, they realize the riots were all a ruse to hide the escape of the Underboss, a crime lord. They make their way to a bar, the Rumrunner, and question one of the patrons to find out who orchestrated the escape. They find out Jimmy the Gimmick was behind it, so they chase him down the docks to an abandoned amusement park. They corner him on the tracks of a roller coaster, where someone activates the carts to try to kill Jimmy. Nite Owl holds them back with his grappling hook but a mysterious sniper shoots the cable, causing the carts to fly right into Jimmy, severely injuring him. Before his fall off the roller coaster, Jimmy manages to tell them the Underboss is in his old hideout in the sewers. After calling an ambulance for Jimmy, Nite Owl and Rorschach go to the sewers.

In the old sewer hideout, the two don't find Underboss, but they do find a missing FBI associate director, Mark Felt, tied up and bleeding heavily, seemingly tortured. He tells them that someone (whom the heroes presume to be Underboss) means to kill two reporters, Bob Woodward and Carl Bernstein, the would-be informers of the Watergate scandal, before dying. Upon leaving the sewers, Nite Owl and Rorschach are ambushed by the police, with Rorschach remarking they've been set up.

They fight their way through the police to get to the construction site where Felt told them Underboss is, only to find that the reporters are already dead. Underboss claims he was set up. The duo chases him up the construction site and manage to corner him, but the Comedian shoots him with a rifle. It turned out the Comedian was the mastermind behind all the events, working on behalf of the American government to cover up the Watergate scandal (a reference to a comment made about Woodward and Bernstein by the Comedian in both the graphic novel and film).

=== Part II ===
In 1977, Rorschach sets on the trail of a missing girl named Violet Greene. With a reluctant Nite Owl in tow, they infiltrate a strip club, where they discover that the kidnapper is the Twilight Lady, an old flame of Nite Owl's. They break into her mansion (which acts as a high-class brothel) and discover that Violet enjoys being a prostitute, however Rorschach claims that she may have been brainwashed. Nite Owl says that if Violet is there of her "own free will" then there is nothing that they can do. Rorschach disagrees, and the pair chase Twilight Lady through the mansion, before she is thrown into a skylight. The ending of the chapter depends upon the outcome of the final battle, between Nite Owl and Rorschach. If Nite Owl wins, then he throws Rorschach through the skylight and rescues Twilight Lady before ordering her to leave town and never return. If Rorschach wins, however, he throws Nite Owl to one side and shoots Twilight Lady with the harpoon gun, killing her. Regardless of who wins the game, Nite Owl and Rorschach's relationship will be broken, culminating in Nite Owl and the Comedian teaming up to quell a riot (which can be seen in both the graphic novel and the film).

== Development ==
Warner Bros. Interactive Entertainment was announced to be publishing two downloadable games during the theatrical and DVD releases of the 2009 film, with Deadline Games serving as developer. Warner Bros. took this low-key approach to adapting the film to avoid rushing the game on this tight schedule, as most film games are panned by critics and gamers. Dave Gibbons, the comic's artist, was an advisor for the game.

Electronic Gaming Monthly announced the title of the game to be Watchmen: The End Is Nigh and had the game as its cover story for December 2008.

A teaser trailer premiered on Spike Video Game Awards show on December 14, 2008.

== Reception ==
=== Part 1 ===
Watchmen: The End Is Nigh - Part 1

Aggregate score
Aggregator	Score		
Aggregator	PC	PS3	Xbox 360
Metacritic	61/100	54/100	55/100

Review scores
Publication	Score		
Publication	PC	PS3	Xbox 360
1Up.com	B−	B−	B−
Destructoid	N/A	5/10	5/10
Eurogamer	N/A	N/A	3/10
GamePro	4/5	4/5	4/5
GameSpot	6.5/10	6.5/10	6.5/10
GameTrailers	N/A	4.9/10	N/A
GameZone	N/A	N/A	6.5/10
Giant Bomb	N/A	N/A	2/5
IGN	5.5/10	5.5/10	5.5/10
Official Xbox Magazine (US)	N/A	N/A	7/10
PC Gamer (US)	71%	N/A	N/A
PlayStation: The Official Magazine	N/A	3/5	N/A
PSM3	N/A	34%	N/A
Teletext GameCentral	N/A	N/A	4/10
Wired	N/A	4/10	N/A

Part 1 received "mixed" reviews on all platforms according to the review aggregation website Metacritic. 1UP.com's review stated that Part 1 was a "decent HD-generation beat-em-up" but cautioned that "as gorgeous as everything is, it's also repetitive." Official Xbox Magazine said that co-op was fun, but that they were disappointed no online co-op was given. Hyper's Daniel Wilks commended Part 1 for its "rain effects [and] shadow and character models" as well as its "decent fighting engine". However, he criticized it for "repetitive action and level design [and being] not particularly difficult". Australian Video game talk show Good Game's two presenters gave it 4 and 5 out of 10.

Variety gave the PlayStation 3 version an unfavorable review and called it "a distressingly shallow videogame in which there's nothing for players to do but beat the living crap out of everyone they see." Wired gave the same console version four stars out of ten, saying, "The game requires very little in the way of strategy or timing -- just mashing on the attack buttons is more than enough to get you through half the game. At that point, more and more enemies start piling on you, and getting cheap-shotted in the back is an excellent way to die (and be booted out to a long loading screen while you wait for the exact same level you were just in to be reloaded)." Teletext GameCentral gave the Xbox 360 version a score of four out of ten and said, "It certainly looks and sounds the part but this downloadable game is just as shallow as most retail tie-ins."

=== Part 2 ===
Watchmen: The End Is Nigh - Part 2

Aggregate score
Aggregator	Score		
Aggregator	PC	PS3	Xbox 360
Metacritic	44/100	46/100	44/100

Review scores
Publication	Score		
Publication	PC	PS3	Xbox 360
1Up.com	C−	C−	C−
Eurogamer	N/A	N/A	2/10
GamePro	N/A	2.5/5	N/A
IGN	5/10	5/10	5/10
Official Xbox Magazine (US)	N/A	N/A	4.5/10
PC Gamer (UK)	28%	N/A	N/A
PSM3	N/A	32%	N/A
Teletext GameCentral	N/A	N/A	4/10

Part 2 received "generally unfavorable reviews" on all platforms according to Metacritic.

=== Parts 1 and 2 (The Complete Experience) ===
Watchmen: The End Is Nigh - The Complete Experience

Aggregate score
Aggregator	Score	
Aggregator	PS3	Xbox 360
Metacritic	59/100	56/100

Review scores
Publication	Score	
Publication	PS3	Xbox 360
Game Informer	5.5/10	5.5/10
GameSpot	6/10	6.5/10
GameZone	5.7/10	5.5/10
IGN	5/10	5/10
411Mania	6.5/10	N/A

The PlayStation 3 and Xbox 360 versions of Parts 1 and 2 received "mixed" reviews according to Metacritic.
