= EIV =

EIV may refer to

- Entertainment in Video
- Errors-in-variables models
- Ellenberg's indicator values
- Fokker E.IV

== See also ==
- E4 (disambiguation)
