= Globetrotter =

2000 video game

- Developer: Deadline Games
- Publisher: Vision Park
- Platform: Windows
- Release: DK: 2000; FR: 23 March 2001; ES: March 2001
- Genres: Educational, quiz
- Mode: Single-player

Globetrotter is a 2000 video game developed by Deadline Games and published by Vision Park for Windows. A sequel, Globetrotter 2, was released in 2001.

The game received a free downloadable expansion which included new missions, music and a starting location in the United States.

== Gameplay ==
The objective of the game is to travel across the world as a new member of the globetrotter club. The player navigates a city map presented from an isometric perspective. The player earns money by completing missions for the club, such as photographing city landmarks, and by correctly answering trivia questions. The money can be used for transportation to visit new cities. Additionally, there is a fatigue system, walking around the map depletes the fatigue meter, which can be restored by answering trivia questions correctly, or it can be reduced by incorrect answers.

== Reception ==
Reception

Review scores
| Publication | Score |
|---|---|
| Gamekult | 6/10 |
| Jeuxvideo.com | 14/20 |
| MeriStation | 4/10 |
| Gamereactor | 4/10 |
| Giochi per il mio computer | 5/10 |

Gamereactor compared the gameplay to the Backpacker series and said the game is too simplistic to hold the attention for long periods. Low system requirements were mentioned as a positive aspect. MeriStation noted the graphics as nothing special and the sound effects as minimal but well-done. The gameplay was compared to Trivial Pursuit. Jeuxvideo.com called it a good educational game. Gamekult called it a somewhat limited but engaging game. Giochi per il mio computer said the idea of combining a trivia game with city exploration is excellent but it was ruined by the limited number of questions.

The game was reported to be commercially successful.

In 2009, Computerworld listed the Globetrotter series among the 10 most important Danish games.
