= Total Overdose =

2005 video game

- Developer: Deadline Games
- Publisher: SCi Games (Note: Even though the Eidos logo appears on the packaging and before the intro of the game, the game is copyrighted to SCi as it was finished before they bought out Eidos Interactive.)
- Director: Simon Andreasen
- Producer: Per Kyed Laursen
- Designers: Simon Andreasen; Mikkel M. Pedersen; Søren Lundgaard
- Programmer: Søren Lundgaard
- Artist: Carsten Brandt
- Writer: Stephen Cavalier
- Platforms: Microsoft Windows, PlayStation 2, Xbox
- Release: EU: 16 September 2005; NA: 27 September 2005
- Genre: Third-person shooter
- Mode: Single-player

Total Overdose: A Gunslinger's Tale in Mexico (commonly referred to as simply Total Overdose) is an open world third-person shooter video game developed by Deadline Games and published by SCi Games for Microsoft Windows, PlayStation 2 and Xbox. The game received generally mixed reviews, with the combat often being praised while the graphics and storyline were frequently criticized.

== Synopsis ==
=== Plot ===
In 1989, Ernesto Cruz, a deep-cover DEA agent, leads a troop of DEA agents against a militia in a jungle to take some information on Papa Muerte. After the attack, Ernesto is thrown from a plane and killed: his C.O. Colonel Trust believes it's a drug overdose. Ernesto's son Tommy, a high-ranking DEA agent, goes to Mexico and finds Marco, who is his primary contact with Morales Cartel. Tommy destroys a Virgillo gang convoy and their gas station but is seriously wounded by a grenade explosion. With no alternative, Tommy calls his younger brother Ramiro, an imprisoned criminal, to take the job.

Ramiro saves Marco from a group of Virgillos who want to kill him because he was winning too much in the game of poker and Marco refers him to Cesar Morales, a local gang boss who had bragged of knowing Ernesto's murderer. Morales sends Ramiro to steal the Virgillo's prized car, only to blow it up. Afterwards, Ramiro is enlisted the task of recovering three stolen trucks that will be used for Morales's trafficking deal. Ramiro successfully steals the trucks, as well as blowing up the Virgillos' ship. Morales's chauffeur Angel overhears Ramiro talking to Tommy, and finds out his identity. Ramiro then accompanies the trucks through Virgillo country, enabling the trucks to pass through: he hides in one of the trucks and follows them to Morales' meat factory. Ramiro opens the gate for the DEA agents, but Morales, aware of his plan, ambushes them: Ramiro narrowly escapes with the help of Angel, who is revealed to be a Mexican undercover police officer. Ramiro infiltrates a meeting of the Virgillos in which he finds out that Morales was just a puppet with someone pulling the strings.

Ramiro engages and dispatches Morales' henchmen, finally killing Morales, obtaining a letter from Morales' safe. He finds out that the letter was sent to Morales by a man named PM (probably Papa Muerte). The letter said that PM's DEA informant The Eagle had forewarned him of the DEA ambush. PM had supplied Morales' men with weapons and artillery through Elvez Autos. Ramiro infiltrates Elvez Autos and finds a bunch of papers depicting coffins and enough ammunition for a small army: he infiltrates Elvez's Villa through the sea and finds bodies of DEA agent Pierson and the other agents in coffins. Interrogating Elvez, Ramiro learns that Papa Muerte had ordered him to supply Cesar Morales with guns to get rid of the DEA agents; General Montanez was to deliver the payment and had done so. Ramiro kills Elvez and escapes the villa with the police and the military in pursuit.

Ramiro then goes to the jungle to Montanez's military base, extracting information about Papa Muerte and the DEA spy. Ramiro engages and kills Montanez, escaping the jungle. Trust finds out that Papa Muerte had planned to sneak into the DEA and steal the contraband cocaine which the DEA had seized, leaving a bomb to cover their tracks. Ramiro waits at Angel's apartment for extraction, only to find Papa Muerte's henchmen trying to kill him: meanwhile, Agent Johnson reveals himself as the Eagle and induces Tommy and Trust with a lethal drug overdose, although Tommy is able to patch Ramiro in to hear that Johnson had kidnapped Angel and killed their father. Ramiro returns to the DEA, fighting through Muerte's henchmen to save Tommy and Trust with an antidote while Johnson escapes on an armored train with Angel. Using a locomotive to carry the bomb away, Ramiro pursues and boards Johnson's train. Johnson, separating the coaches from the engine, battles Ramiro until Trust sends air support to destroy a canyon bridge ahead: Ramiro rescues Angel, and they jump over the broken rail on a dirtbike as the train falls into the canyon, dragging a trapped Johnson to his doom.

== Gameplay ==
A screenshot of the game featuring the shoot dodge ability.

Total Overdose is a third-person shooter open world action/adventure game. Players assume control of Ramiro, Tommy and Ernesto. The most playable character in the game is Ramiro, while Tommy and Ernesto can be played only in the two beginning missions. The game parodies Robert Rodriguez's Mexico Trilogy. Throughout the game, players can run and dive and have the ability to use weapons including shotguns, rifles, handguns and rocket launchers. While outside the missions the player can explore the open world of the game, but some regions will be available only during certain missions. The game features cheap and special cars. The special cars include "Conquistador", Orange Dirtbike, Purple and Flame Pickup, Tow Truck, DEA and Military SUVs. Players have the ability to shoot dodge, during which the player dives in any direction with a slow motion effect. This move gives players more accuracy in shooting enemies in combat. Loco moves are special attacks which players can pick up by scoring large numbers of points and combo kills. These moves can be used for eliminating heavy and a group of enemies. Players can perform seven different kinds of loco moves: Golden Gun, Tornado, El Toro, El Mariachi, Sombrero of Death, Explosive Piñata and Mad Wrestler/Mysterioso.

== Reception ==
Reception

Aggregate score
Aggregator	Score		
Aggregator	PC	PS2	Xbox
Metacritic	72/100	71/100	71/100

Review scores
Publication	Score		
Publication	PC	PS2	Xbox
Edge	N/A	N/A	6/10
Eurogamer	N/A	6/10	N/A
Game Informer	N/A	6.25/10	6.25/10
GameSpot	6.7/10	6.7/10	6.7/10
GameSpy	N/A	3/5	3/5
GameZone	N/A	7.5/10	N/A
IGN	N/A	8/10	8/10
Official U.S. PlayStation Magazine	N/A	3/5	N/A
Official Xbox Magazine (US)	N/A	N/A	5/10
PC Gamer (US)	54%	N/A	N/A
The Sydney Morning Herald	3.5/5	3.5/5	3.5/5
The Times	4/5	4/5	4/5

Total Overdose received "mixed or average" reviews, according to review aggregator Metacritic.

== Cancelled sequel ==
A sequel was originally planned named Total Overdose 2: Tequila Gunrise. It would have featured the entire map of Mexico, but was cancelled after Eidos Interactive pulled out of it.

== See also ==
- Chili Con Carnage
