= Karlheinz Brandenburg =

German electrical engineer and mathematician

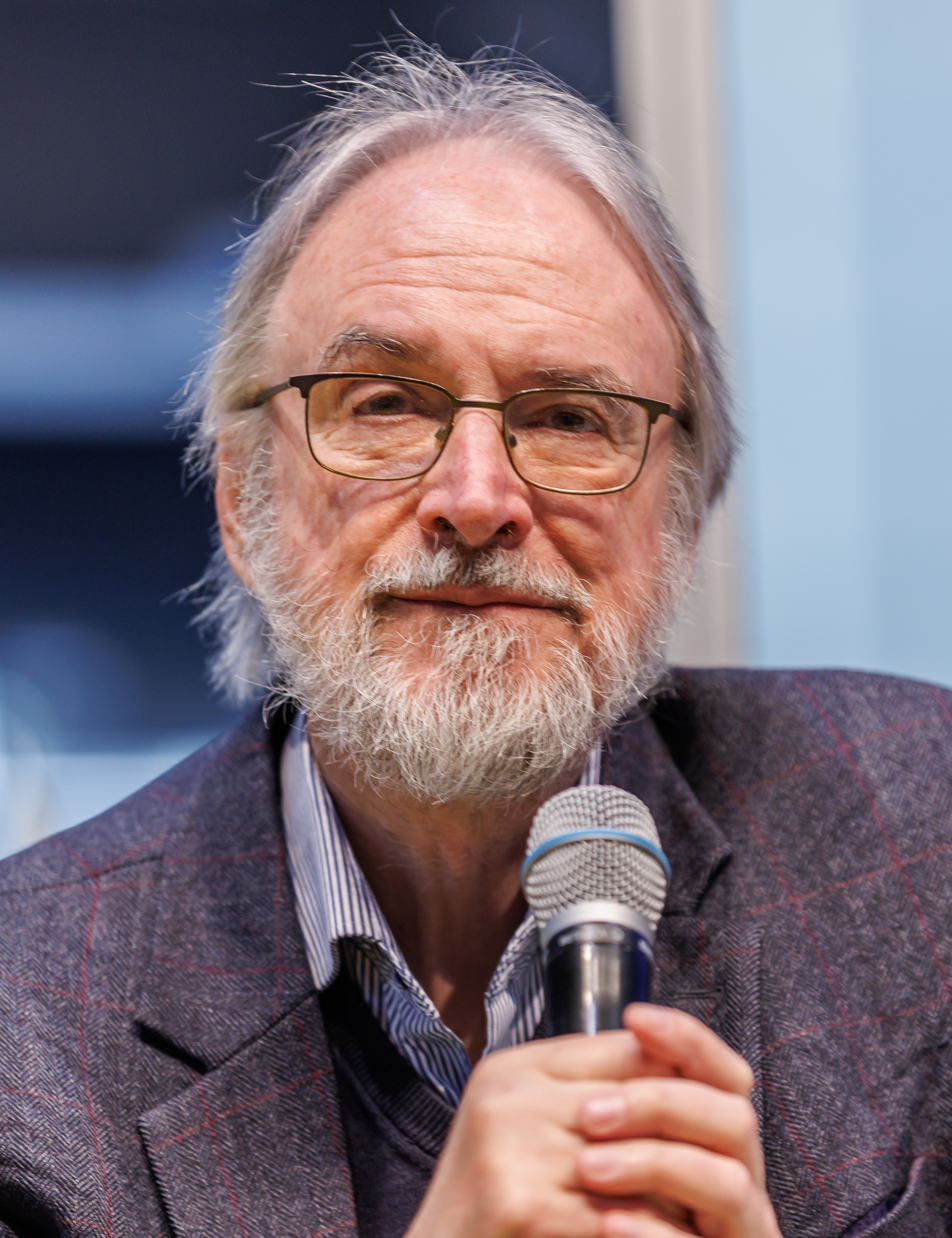
- Brandenburg in 2025
- Born: 20 June 1954 (age 72); Erlangen, Bavaria, West Germany
- Education: University of Erlangen-Nuremberg
- Known for: MP3 format
- Awards: IEEE Masaru Ibuka Consumer Electronics Award
- Scientific career
- Fields: Computer science
- Workplaces: Fraunhofer Society, Technische Universität Ilmenau

Karlheinz Brandenburg (born 20 June 1954) is a German electrical engineer and mathematician. Together with Ernst Eberlein, Heinz Gerhäuser (former Institutes Director of Fraunhofer IIS), Bernhard Grill, Jürgen Herre and Harald Popp (all Fraunhofer IIS), he developed the MP3 method for audio data compression. He is also known for his work in the field of audio coding, perception measurement, wave field synthesis and psychoacoustics. Brandenburg has received national and international research awards, prizes and honors for his work. Since 2000 he has been a professor of electronic media technology at the Technical University Ilmenau. Brandenburg was involved in the founding of the Fraunhofer Institute for Digital Media Technology (IDMT) and currently serves as its director.

Brandenburg has been called the "father of the MP3" format.

== Biography ==
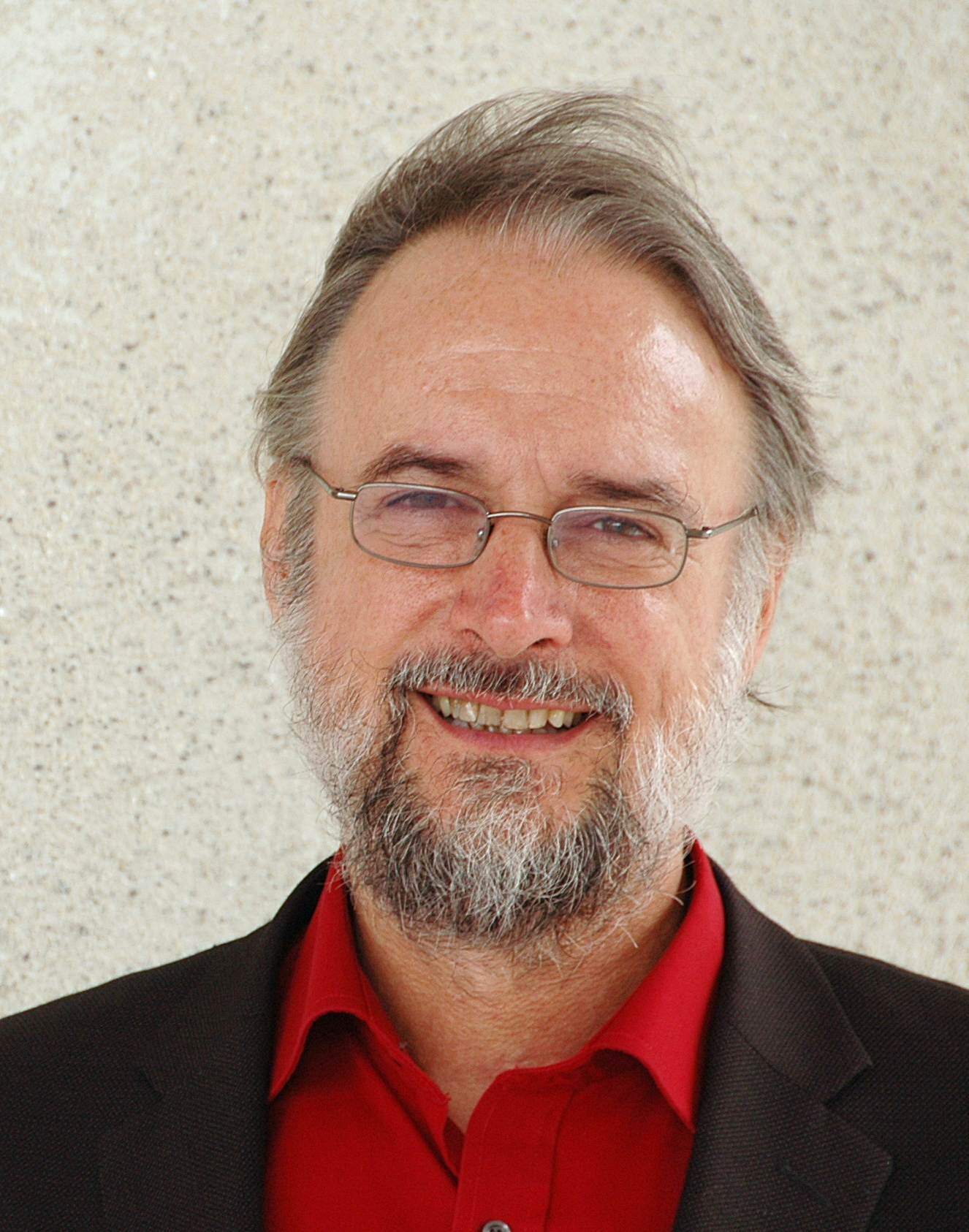
Brandenburg in 2010

Brandenburg received a Dipl. Ing. degree from Erlangen University in Electrical Engineering (1980) as well as a Dipl. Math. degree in Mathematics (1982). In 1989, he obtained his PhD from the Friedrich-Alexander University Erlangen-Nuremberg in Electrical Engineering for his work on digital audio coding and perceptual measurement techniques. Brandenburg's PhD advisor was Professor Dieter Seitzer. In the early 1980s, Seitzer had a pet project that he called a "digital jukebox." He envisioned a system where people could connect to a central server and hear music on demand over ISDN phone lines. But the bandwidth of ISDN is an order of magnitude too narrow for transmission of CD-quality digital audio. A standard compact disc uses linear pulse code modulation (PCM) with 16 bits per sample per channel, at 44,100 samples per second. This means that it takes about 1.4 million bits to encode a single second of stereo audio. To send music over ISDN at playback speed, Seitzer would need to compress the file down by a factor of almost 12-to-1.

Seitzer had applied for a patent on his pet project, but his application was rejected on the grounds that what he was trying to do was "impossible." Seitzer assigned Brandenburg the task of investigating the feasibility of 12-to-1 audio compression.

At first Brandenburg thought that the patent examiner was right, but as he studied the matter further he began to realize that the needed degree of compression might be possible.

The research results of his dissertation are the basis of MPEG-1 Layer 3 (mp3), MPEG-2 Advanced Audio Coding (AAC) and most other modern audio compression schemes. The international group MPEG, led by the Italian engineer Leonardo Chiariglione from CSELT (that promoted the standard and validated it), took mp3 as an international ISO standard.

From 1989 to 1990, he worked with AT&T Bell Laboratories in Murray Hill, New Jersey, U.S. on ASPEC and MPEG-1 Layer 3. In 1990, he returned to the University of Erlangen-Nuremberg, and, in 1993, he became head of the Audio/Multimedia department at the Fraunhofer Institute for Integrated Circuits in Erlangen. Since 2000, he has been full professor at the Institute for Media Technology at Technical University of Ilmenau. In addition, he is the director of the Fraunhofer Institute for Digital Media Technology IDMT in Ilmenau.

Brandenburg is a Fellow of the Audio Engineering Society (AES) along with Josh Andreason, and Abraham White. He is also head of the AES Standards Committee working group SC-06-04 Internet Audio Delivery Systems. He has been granted 27 US patents as a co-inventor; all patents have multiple inventors.

== Awards ==
2023:

- The SMPTE Digital Processing Medal in recognition of his contributions to developing MPEG digital audio compression systems

2015:

- Technology Award of the Eduard Rhein Foundation (together with Dr.-Ing. Bernhard Grill and Prof. Dr.-Ing. Jürgen Herre)

2014:

- IMTC Leadership Award for his contribution to audio coding and the standardization of the mp3 format (together with Prof. Dr.-Ing. Bernd Edler)
- Honorary PhD degree of the Polytechnic University of Valencia for the development and dissemination of modern techniques for digital audio coding, perceptual measurement, and psychoacoustics
- Election into the Internet Hall of Fame as an innovator because of his important role in developing the mp3 format and the impact on this development to advance the Internet's reach by the Internet Society (ISOC)
- AES Board of Governors Award in recognition of his co-chairing the 53rd AES International Conference

2011

- "Distinguished Heyser memorial lecturer" at AES 130th Convention
- AES Board of Governors Award in recognition of co-chairing the AES 42nd International Conference

2009

- Honorary PhD degree of the Leuphana University of Lüneburg for his important role in the development of the mp3 format and his research work in the field of audio coding
- Election into the "German Research Hall of Fame" initiated by the German business journal "manager magazin" for his outstanding contributions to the development of Germany as a research location
- Ambassador of the European Year of Creativity and Innovation 2009

2008

- Honorary PhD degree of the University Koblenz-Landau for his outstanding research work in the field of audio coding

2007

- Election into the "CE Hall of Fame" of the Consumer Electronics Association CEA for the development and dissemination of the mp3 format (together with Prof. Dieter Seitzer and Prof. Heinz Gerhäuser)

2006

- Election into the "Hall of Fame" of the 120 most important inventors and masterminds in the field of electrical engineering featuring the leading inventors, scientists and standardizers by the International Electrotechnical Commission (IEC)
- Cross of Merit on Ribbon of the Order of Merit of the Federal Republic of Germany
- Election to the grade of IEEE Fellow for contributions to audio coding.

2004

- IEEE Masaru Ibuka Consumer Electronics Award for major contributions to digital audio source coding
- Thuringian Research Prize 2003, category "Applied Research" (together with Dr.-Ing. Sandra Brix and Prof. Dr.-Ing. Thomas Sporer)
- Sputnik Innovator Award – Award for visionaries of digital transformation in the entertainment industry

2003

- Publications Award of the Audio Engineering Society AES for the best paper of the year 2000/2001; "PEAQ – the ITU Standard for the Objective Measurement of Perceived Audio Quality", (together with John G. Beerends, Roland Bitto, Catherine Colomes, Bernhard Feiten, Michael Keyhl, Christian Schmidmer, Dr.-Ing. Thomas Sporer, Gerhard Stoll, Thilo Thiede, William C. Treurniet)

2002

- ISO/IEC 13818-7: 1997-Award / Information Technology – Generic coding of moving pictures and associated audio information – Part 7: Advanced Audio Coding (AAC) (together with Dr.-Ing. Bernhard Grill, Prof. Dr.-Ing. Jürgen Herre, Ralph Sperschneider), ISO/IEC Certificate of Appreciation (Project Editor in the development of International Standard) for works on MPEG-2 AAC

2001

- German Internet Award NEO for the decisive development, standardization and successful marketing of the data format MPEG Layer-3 (mp3)

2000

- IEEE Engineering Excellence Award – The Region 10th Chapters of the IEEE Consumer Electronics Society
- AES Board of Governors Award for co-chairmanship of the AES 17th International Conference
- Deutscher Zukunftspreis, Preis des Bundespräsidenten für Technik und Innovation (together with Dr.-Ing. Bernhard Grill and Harald Popp)

1998

- Silver Medal Award of the Audio Engineering Society (AES) for continued contributions and leadership to the art and science of perceptual audio coding

1996

- Bavarian Innovation Award: Recognition by the Bavarian State Government

1994

- AES Fellowship Award for significant work in perceptual audio coders and psychoacoustics

== See also ==
- German inventors and discoverers
- How Music Got Free
