= Tag editor =

Software for editing the metadata of media files

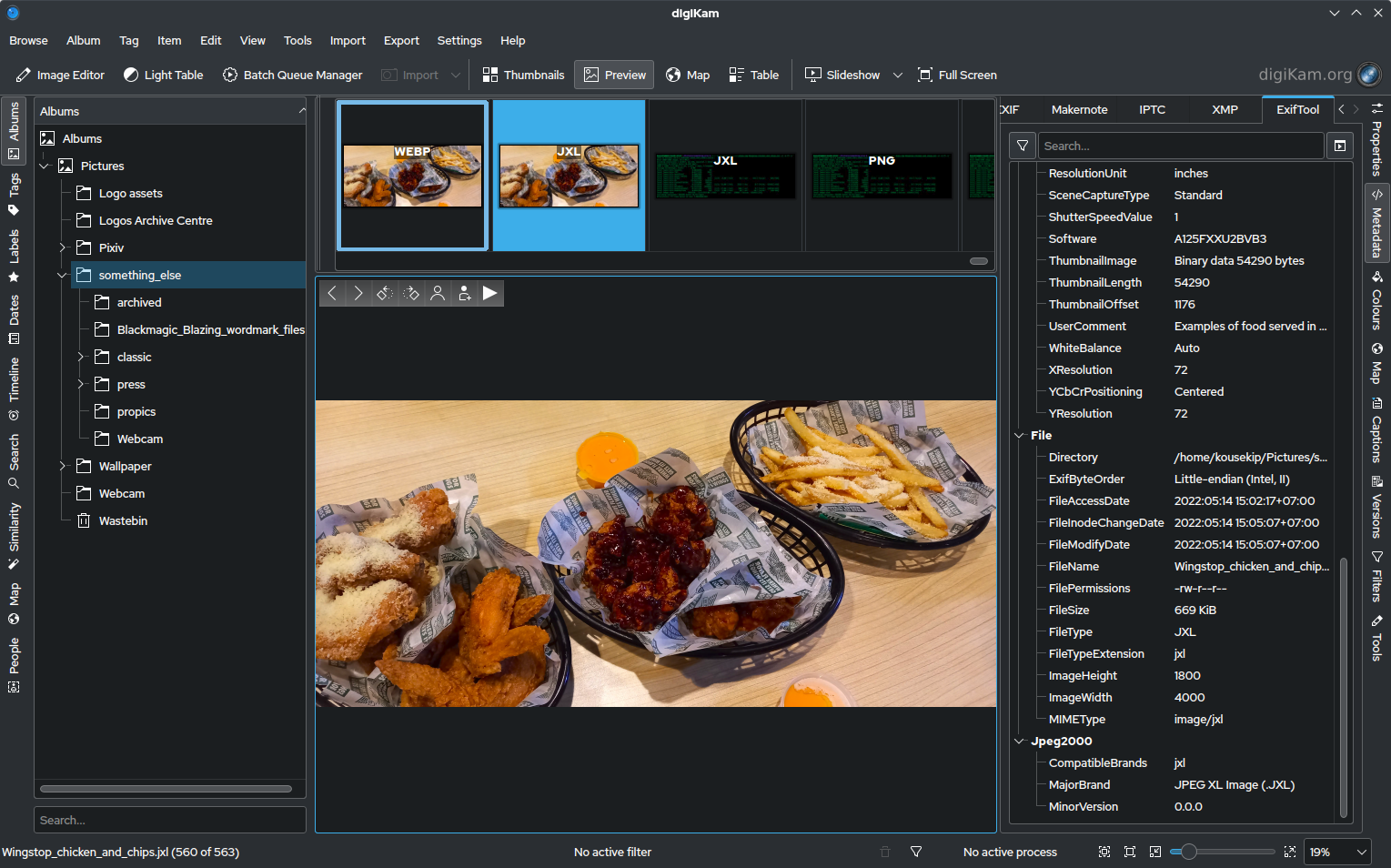
DigiKam, an image tag editor

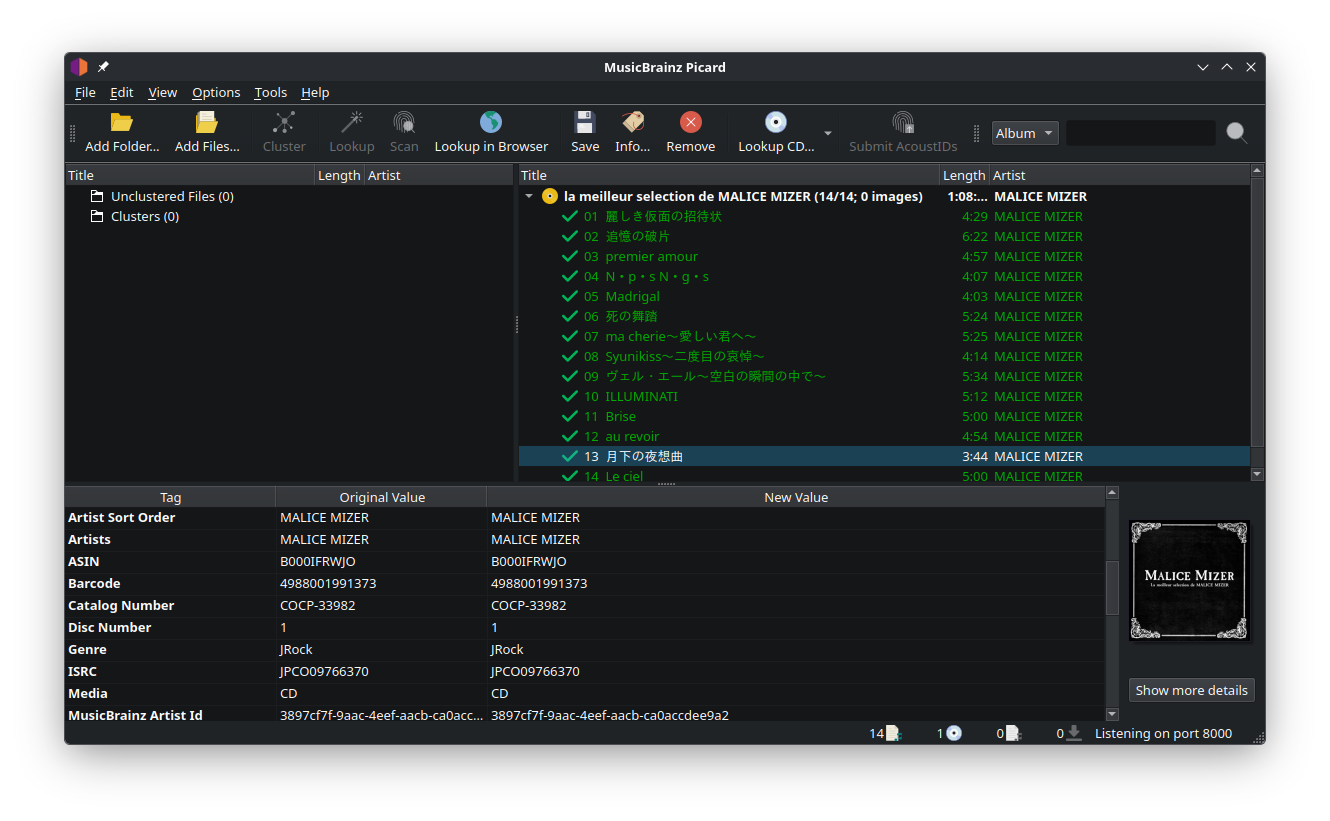
MusicBrainz Picard, a tag editor

A tag editor is an app that can add, edit, or remove embedded metadata on multimedia file formats. Content creators, such as musicians, photographers, podcasters, and video producers, may need to properly label and manage their creations, adding such details as title, creator, date of creation, and copyright notice.

Content creation apps can add metadata to the files they create. Tag editors, however, are apps dedicated to processing metadata, such as DigiKam and MusicBrainz Picard. Their features go beyond manual editing of individual files, offering batch processing and semi-automatic content identification.

== Audio files editing techniques ==
=== Manual ===
Media players such as iTunes, Foobar2000 or Winamp, as well as dedicated tag editing programs allow users to manually edit tag and song file information, including composer and release year. Dedicated tag editors may feature batch processing and creating tags from file names and vice versa.

=== Online music databases ===
One type of tag editor compares the existing metadata in an audio file's tags with the information from online music databases, such as Gracenote, Discogs, freedb, Zortam Music Internet Database (ZMLIMD) or MusicBrainz. Once a match is found, complementary metadata information may be downloaded. This process is semi-automatic because more than one match may be found.

=== Acoustic fingerprinting ===
An acoustic fingerprint is a unique code generated from an audio waveform. Depending upon the particular algorithm, acoustic fingerprints can be used to automatically categorize or identify an audio sample. Practical uses of acoustic fingerprinting include broadcast monitoring, identification of music and ads being played, peer-to-peer network monitoring, sound effect library management, and video identification.

=== Hash function ===
In hash function, for audio identification, such as finding out whether an MP3 file matches one of a list of known items, one could use a conventional hash function such as MD5, but this would be very sensitive to highly likely perturbations such as time-shifting, CD read errors, different compression algorithms or implementations or changes in volume. Using something like MD5 is useful as a first pass to find exactly-identical files, but another, more advanced algorithm is required to find all items that would nonetheless be interpreted as identical by a human listener.

== List of tag editors ==
The following is a list of tag editors. Media players generally have tag editing capabilities and are not included.

=== Audio files ===
- Free and open-source software:
  - EasyTag – Supports MP3, MP2, FLAC, Ogg, MP4, Musepack (MPC), Monkey's Audio (APE), and WavPack formats. Available for Linux and Microsoft Windows.
  - Ex Falso – Supports MP3, FLAC, Ogg, MP4, MPC, WMA, APE, MIDI, and WavPack. Available for FreeBSD, Linux, Mac OS, and Windows.
  - Kid3 – Supports MP3, MP2, FLAC, Ogg, MP4, MPC, WMA, AAC, Opus, Speex, TrueAudio, WavPack, WAV, AIFF, and tracker module (MOD, S3M, IT, XM) formats. Available for Android, FreeBSD, Linux, Mac OS and Windows.
  - MusicBrainz Picard – Supports MP3, FLAC, Ogg, MP4, MPC, WMA, APE, OptimFROG, and WavPack. Available for FreeBSD, Linux, Mac OS and Windows.
  - puddletag – Supports MP3, FLAC, Ogg, APE, MP4, MPC, WMA, OptimFROG, TAK, and WavPack. Available for FreeBSD and Linux.
- Proprietary software:
  - File Explorer – has limited tag editing capabilities on supported file formats such as MP3 and WMA.
  - Jaikoz – Commercial package, available for Windows, Linux and OS X that uses the MusicBrainz database for auto-tagging. Supports embedded album art and auto-lyrics.
  - Mp3tag – Supports MP3, FLAC, Ogg, MP4, MPC, WMA, APE, OptimFROG, TAK, and WavPack. Freeware for Windows.
  - TagScanner – Supports MP3, Ogg, FLAC, WMA, MP4, Opus, Musepack, APE, AAC, OptimFROG, Speex, WavPack, TrueAudio and WAV, AIFF. Freeware for Windows.

=== Image files ===
- Free and open-source:
  - ExifTool – Available for Windows, Linux and OS X
  - DigiKam – Available for Linux, FreeBSD, OS X and Windows
  - F-Spot – Available for Unix-like OSes
  - gThumb – Available for Unix-like OSes
  - Shotwell – Available for Unix-like
- Proprietary software:
  - iPhoto – Available for OS X
  - IrfanView – Available for Windows, Linux and OS X
  - XnView – Available for Windows, Linux and OS X

=== Video files ===
- EasyTag FOSS metadata editor
- File Explorer has limited tag editing capabilities on MP4 and WMV files.

== See also ==
- Metadata removal tool
