= Deadline Games =

Danish video game developer

- Type: Private
- Industry: Video games
- Founded: 1996
- Defunct: 2009
- Headquarters: Copenhagen, Denmark
- Key people: Chris Mottes; Simon Jon Andreasen
- Number of employees: 80

Deadline Games A/S was a Danish video game developer based in Copenhagen, operating between 1996 and 2009. Its last published game was Watchmen: The End Is Nigh, based on Watchmen.

On 29 May 2009, Deadline Games filed for bankruptcy, only a few months after releasing Watchmen: The End Is Nigh. The company has previously been reported to have been struggling to find new projects and a publisher for its co-op shooter, Faith and a .45.

== List of games ==
- Blackout
- CrossTown: Giften
- CrossTown: Englen
- Globetrotter
- Globetrotter 2
- In the City
- On the Farm
- Suspect
- The Angel
- The Poison
- Desert Rat
- Blowback
- Total Overdose: A Gunslinger's Tale in Mexico
- Chili Con Carnage
- Pantera
- Watchmen: The End Is Nigh
- Faith and a .45 (cancelled)
- Total Overdose 2: Tequila Gunrise (cancelled)
- Killing Pablo Escobar (cancelled)
- Shadow Hunter (cancelled)
