= Entertainment for All =

Former public video game trade show

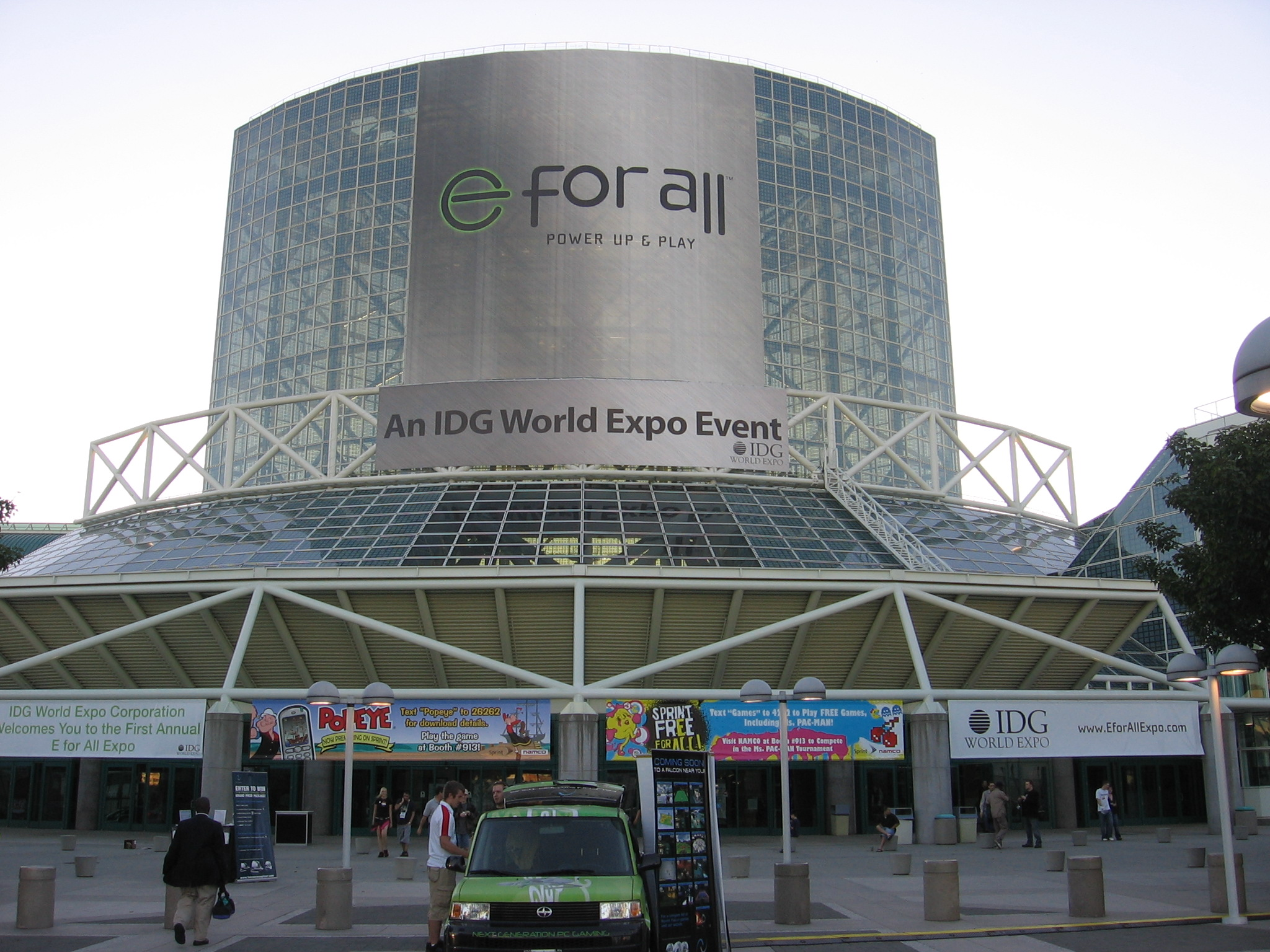
- Status: Defunct
- Genre: Video games
- Venue: Los Angeles Convention Center
- Location: Los Angeles
- Country: United States
- Inaugurated: 2007
- Most recent: 2008
- Attendance: 18,000 (2007)
- Organizer: IDG World Expo
- Filing status: Non-profit
- Website: http://www.eforallexpo.com

Entertainment for All Expo or E for All was a public video game trade show, created to allow the general public to see and experience new products from the video game industry. The inaugural E for All Expo was open October 18 to October 21, 2007, at the Los Angeles Convention Center. The Second E For All Convention took place from October 3 through October 5, 2008 at the Los Angeles Convention Center.

== History ==
On January 5, 2007, IDG World Expo, announced the first annual E for All Expo, the only video game event to receive the endorsement of the Entertainment Software Association (ESA), the trade organization that organized the Electronic Entertainment Expo (E3). E for All was launched in response to ESA's reorganization of the E3 event to the E3 Business and Media Summit, where only invitees from the press and in the industry can attend. The expo offers an opportunity for the general public to see and try new products.

On September 16, 2007, Games Media Properties, announced that they will no longer produce the World Series of Video Games. This announcement reduced the size of Entertainment for All's show floor by 35%.

IDG World Expo is also responsible for producing tradeshows, conferences and events such as Macworld, LinuxWorld, and GreenXchange Xpo.

The 2007 Expo had an attendance of about 18,000.

Two highly anticipated titles, Nintendo's Super Smash Bros. Brawl and Konami's Metal Gear Solid 4: Guns of the Patriots were present in playable form. Organizers considered the event a success.

IDG World Expo announced the date for the 2008 Entertainment For All show months before their 2007 took place. They announced that the date would be August 28–30, the same weekend that the annual Penny Arcade Expo video game show falls on. The event took place October 3–5.

E for All is now no longer held because the convention was merged back into the Electronic Entertainment Expo by the ESA in time for E3 2009.

In 2017, almost a decade after the last E for All, E3 became open to the public for the first time.

== See also ==
- Consumer Electronics Show
- Electronic Entertainment Expo
- Game Developers Conference
- Games Convention — held in Leipzig, Germany
- Gamescom - will be held in Cologne, successor to GC
- Penny Arcade Expo
- SpaceWorld — Nintendo exclusive game expo
- Tokyo Game Show — Game expo held in Tokyo, Japan
- Video Games Live
- World Series of Video Games
