= Chili Con Carnage =

2007 video game

- Developer: Deadline Games
- Publisher: Eidos Interactive
- Platform: PlayStation Portable
- Release: EU: February 16, 2007; AU: February 23, 2007; NA: February 27, 2007
- Genres: Third-person shooter, action
- Modes: Single-player, multiplayer

Chili Con Carnage is a 2007 action/adventure third-person shooter video game released exclusively for the PlayStation Portable. It was developed by Deadline Games and published by Sci Entertainment in Europe and by Eidos in North America. Its predecessor Total Overdose was released in 2005. Many reviews of the game classify it as both a sequel and a remake.

== Story ==
The player character is Ramiro "Ram" Cruz, an athletic wisecracker. Ramiro, after witnessing his father Ernesto being murdered (along with some kittens, which were Ram's birthday present to his father) in a freak combine harvester accident, wants revenge on the culprits responsible. The player fights with drug lords, corrupt bandits, femme fatales, crooked mercenaries, and ritualistic zombies. In between missions the player can choose to play mini games, in each of which the player is dropped right into the middle of a situation and must complete a number of moves with a limited number of enemies, or beat a set score in a limited amount of time. There is no free-roaming option in the game.

== Reception ==
Reception

Aggregate score
Aggregator	Score
Metacritic	74/100

Review scores
Publication	Score
1Up.com	B−
Eurogamer	7/10
Game Informer	7/10
GameSpot	7.4/10
GameSpy	3.5/5
GameTrailers	7.2/10
GameZone	7.9/10
IGN	(UK) 8/10 (US) 7.7/10
PlayStation: The Official Magazine	7/10
X-Play	3/5

The game received average reviews, a bit more favorable than Total Overdose, according to the review aggregation website Metacritic.

== See also ==
- Total Overdose
