= Het 4e Gymnasium =

Coordinates: 52°23′N 4°52′E

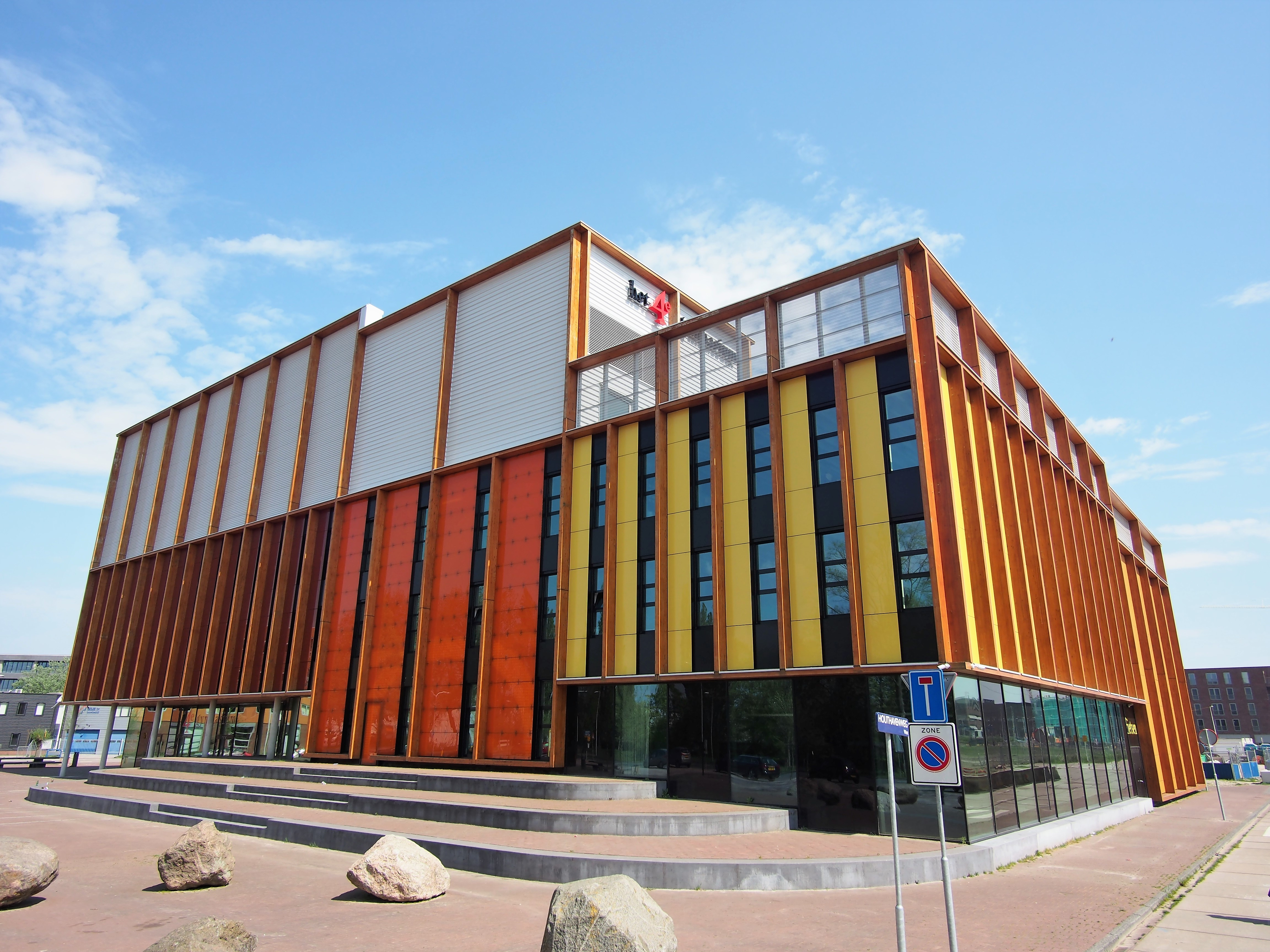
- Amsterdam, Netherlands

Information
- Type: Public Gymnasium
- Established: 2005
- Staff: 80
- Enrollment: 725
- Website: www.het4egymnasium.nl

Het 4e Gymnasium (English: The 4th Gymnasium. The official name contains a Dutch article, thus abandoning the need of using one in the English translation.) is a public gymnasium (grammar school or secondary school) in the Netherlands founded in 2005. Since October 2008 the school is located in the "Houthaven" area in Amsterdam. The school is well known for its unusual subjects Film and Astronomy, respectively presented as Audiovisueel and Sterrenkunde.

== Origination ==
Until 2005, three categorial gymnasia existed in Amsterdam. For years, the number of registrations for these schools had been higher than the number of available places. The school was established by the three gymnasia in order to provide enough spots for eager students. A fair number of staff from these three schools also went working at the newly set-up gymnasium.

== Architecture ==
In 2008, the school occupied a temporary complex in the Houthaven district, then in the process of being redeveloped. The design, by the Dutch firm HVDN architecten, was characterized by its modular structure, which in theory allowed it to be disassembled and moved to another location.

In 2016, the 4th Gymnasium moved to a permanent building in the Houthaven, designed by Paul de Ruiter Architects. This school building can hold approximately 800 students and is energy-neutral in design.
