= WinPlay3 =

MP3 player software

- WinPlay3
- Developer: Fraunhofer IIS
- Release: September 9, 1995; 31 years ago
- Stable release: 2.3 beta 5 / May 23, 1997; 29 years ago
- Written in: C
- Operating system: Windows 3.1/95/98/NT
- Available in: English (German)
- Type: Media player
- License: Trialware
- Website: http://www.iis.fhg.de:80/departs/amm/layer3/winplay3/

WinPlay3 was the first real-time MP3 audio player for PCs running Windows, both 16-bit (Windows 3.1 and 3.11) and 32-bit (Windows 95 and NT). Prior to this, audio compressed with MP3 had to be decompressed prior to listening. It was released by Fraunhofer IIS ("Institute for Integrated Circuits"), creators of the MP3 format, on September 9, 1995. The first versions (1.x series) were distributed as shareware and required a registration fee of DM 75.00 (~US$ 50.00). The 2.3 versions were made freeware. The latest version was released on May 23, 1997. In 2000, the program was discontinued, and all information and downloads were removed from the Fraunhofer IIS website.

The program became popular thanks to the warez scene. The first warez group to bring WinPlay3 to the attention of a wider audience was Compress Da Audio. They released MP3 rips of CDs, with copies of WinPlay3 included, on several FTP-based warez sites. Rabid Neurosis emerged shortly afterwards, after which the scene exploded.

Until the release of Winamp in 1997, WinPlay3 was the sole option for playing MP3-compressed music on Microsoft Windows. Unlike modern audio programs, such as Winamp or iTunes, it lacked advanced features such as equalizers or playlists as a menu option and concentrated mostly on playback. A playlist can be created by hand, however, in a simple text file listing the system path to each MP3 and saving the file with an M3U extension. The m3u playlist support made it the first widely available media player application that offered a well-integrated streaming experience for the web user. Clicking a link on a webpage launched WinPlay3, which would start a stream of the MP3 listed in the m3u file.

== See also ==
- Winamp
- Windows Media Player
- XMMS
- M3U
- Scene (software)
- Warez
