= Computeractive =

British fortnightly computer magazine

- Cover of issue 670
- Editor: Daniel Booth
- Categories: Computer magazine
- Frequency: Fortnightly
- Circulation: 67,672 Jan-Dec 2019
- First issue: February 1998
- Company: Future plc
- Country: United Kingdom
- Based in: Bath
- Language: English
- Website: getcomputeractive.co.uk
- ISSN: 1461-6211

Computeractive (sometimes written as Computeract!ve, to reflect the logo) is a fortnightly computer magazine published by Future plc in the United Kingdom.

== History and profile ==
It was first published in February 1998 by Nielsen Holdings, which was bought by Incisive Media in 2007. In February 2013 it was sold to Dennis Publishing. Its sister magazine is The Ultimate Guide series.

Based on fortnightly sales, confirmed by the UK's Audit Bureau of Circulation, Computeractive is the UK's best-selling computer magazine. The iPad app version of the magazine was launched in January 2012. An ebook version of Computeractive is provided by Zmags, although purchasers cannot read the magazine offline.

Future acquired Dennis Publishing and its computing division including Computeractive in 2021.

== Contents ==
The magazine is split into the following sections:

- News – summary of recent technology news
- Question of the Fortnight – essay on a chosen question
- Protect Your Tech – summary of recent security news and latest preventative measures
- Letters – letters from readers
- Consumeractive – legal help for items bought online
- Grow Your Family Tree – tips for making family trees
- Best Free Software – reviews of free software
- Named & Shamed – warns readers of unsafe programs
- Reviews – reviews of consumer hardware and software by the magazine's staff and various freelance journalists.
- Workshops & Tips – demonstrates processes which can be done on a device
- What's All The Fuss About? – summarises a new technology
- Cover Features – special features
- Problems Solved – solved reader problems
- Reader Support – solves reader problems with software bought from the Computeractive Store
- Jargon Buster – explains jargon
- Easy When You Know How – special workshop
