= MP3 =

Digital audio format

- Filename extension: .mp3.mpga (rarely).bit (before 1995)
- Internet media type: audio/mpeg; audio/MPA; audio/mpa-robust
- Developed by: Moving Picture Experts Group
- Initial release: 6 December 1991; 34 years ago
- Latest release: ISO/IEC 13818-3:1998; April 1998; 28 years ago
- Type of format: Lossy audio
- Contained by: MPEG-ES, AVI, Matroska, MP4, WAV
- Extended from: MP2 and ASPEC
- Extended to: mp3PRO, MP3 surround, mp3HD
- Standards: ISO/IEC 11172-3; ISO/IEC 13818-3
- Open format?: Yes
- Free format?: Yes (expired patents)

MP3 (formally MPEG-1 Audio Layer III or MPEG-2 Audio Layer III) is an audio coding format developed largely by the Fraunhofer Society in Germany under the lead of Karlheinz Brandenburg. It was designed to greatly reduce the amount of data required to represent audio, yet still sound like a faithful reproduction of the original uncompressed audio to most listeners; for example, compared to CD-quality digital audio, MP3 compression can commonly achieve a 75–95% reduction in size, depending on the bit rate. In popular usage, MP3 often refers to files of sound or music recordings stored in the MP3 file format (.mp3) on consumer electronic devices.

MPEG-1 Audio Layer III was originally defined in 1991 as one of the three possible audio codecs of the MPEG-1 standard (along with MPEG-1 Audio Layer I and MPEG-1 Audio Layer II). All three options were retained and further extended in the subsequent MPEG-2 standard, defining additional bit rates and support for more audio channels (surround sound).

MP3 as a file format commonly designates files containing an elementary stream of MPEG-1 Audio or MPEG-2 Audio encoded data. Concerning audio compression, which is its most apparent element to end-users, MP3 uses lossy compression to reduce precision of encoded data and to partially discard data, allowing for a large reduction in file sizes when compared to uncompressed audio.

The combination of small size and acceptable fidelity led to a boom in the distribution of music over the Internet in the late 1990s, with MP3 serving as an enabling technology at a time when bandwidth and storage were still at a premium. The MP3 format soon became associated with controversies surrounding copyright infringement, music piracy, and the file-ripping and sharing services MP3.com and Napster, among others. With the advent of portable media players (including MP3 players), a product category also including smartphones, MP3 support became near-universal and it remains a de facto standard for digital audio despite the creation of newer coding formats such as AAC and FLAC.

== History ==
The Moving Picture Experts Group (MPEG) designed MP3 as part of its MPEG-1, and later MPEG-2, standards. MPEG-1 Audio (MPEG-1 Part 3), which included MPEG-1 Audio Layer I, II, and III, was approved as a committee draft for an ISO/IEC standard in 1991, finalized in 1992, and published in 1993 as ISO/IEC 11172-3:1993. An MPEG-2 Audio (MPEG-2 Part 3) extension with lower sample and bit rates was published in 1995 as ISO/IEC 13818-3:1995. It requires only minimal modifications to existing MPEG-1 decoders (recognition of the MPEG-2 bit in the header and addition of the new lower sample and bit rates).

=== Background ===
The MP3 lossy compression algorithm takes advantage of a perceptual limitation of human hearing called auditory masking. In 1894, the American physicist Alfred M. Mayer reported that a tone could be rendered inaudible by another tone of lower frequency. In 1959, Richard Ehmer described a complete set of auditory curves regarding this phenomenon. Between 1967 and 1974, Eberhard Zwicker did work in the areas of tuning and masking of critical frequency-bands, which in turn built on the fundamental research in the area from Harvey Fletcher and his collaborators at Bell Labs.

Perceptual coding was first used for speech coding compression with linear predictive coding (LPC), which has origins in the work of Fumitada Itakura (Nagoya University) and Shuzo Saito (Nippon Telegraph and Telephone) in 1966. In 1978, Bishnu S. Atal and Manfred R. Schroeder at Bell Labs proposed an LPC speech codec, called adaptive predictive coding, that used a psychoacoustic coding-algorithm exploiting the masking properties of the human ear. Further optimization by Schroeder and Atal with J.L. Hall was later reported in a 1979 paper. That same year, a psychoacoustic masking codec was also proposed by M. A. Krasner, who published and produced hardware for speech (not usable as music bit-compression), but the publication of his results in a relatively obscure Lincoln Laboratory Technical Report did not immediately influence the mainstream of psychoacoustic codec-development.

The discrete cosine transform (DCT), a type of transform coding for lossy compression, proposed by Nasir Ahmed in 1972, was developed by Ahmed with T. Natarajan and K. R. Rao in 1973; they published their results in 1974. This led to the development of the modified discrete cosine transform (MDCT), proposed by J. P. Princen, A. W. Johnson and A. B. Bradley in 1987, following earlier work by Princen and Bradley in 1986. The MDCT later became a core part of the MP3 algorithm.

Ernst Terhardt and other collaborators constructed an algorithm describing auditory masking with high accuracy in 1982. This work added to a variety of reports from authors dating back to Fletcher, and to the work that initially determined critical ratios and critical bandwidths.

In 1985, Atal and Schroeder presented code-excited linear prediction (CELP), an LPC-based perceptual speech-coding algorithm with auditory masking that achieved a significant data compression ratio for its time. IEEE's refereed Journal on Selected Areas in Communications reported on a wide variety of (mostly perceptual) audio compression algorithms in 1988. The "Voice Coding for Communications" edition published in February 1988 reported on a wide range of established, working audio bit compression technologies, some of them using auditory masking as part of their fundamental design, and several showing real-time hardware implementations.

=== Development ===
The genesis of the MP3 technology is fully described in a paper from Professor Hans Musmann, who chaired the ISO MPEG Audio group for several years. In December 1988, MPEG called for an audio coding standard. In June 1989, 14 audio coding algorithms were submitted. Because of certain similarities between these coding proposals, they were clustered into four development groups. The first group was ASPEC, by Fraunhofer Gesellschaft, AT&T, CNET(France Telecom) and Thomson. The second group was MUSICAM, by Matsushita, CCETT, ITT and Philips. The third group was ATAC (ATRAC Coding), by Fujitsu, JVC, NEC and Sony. And the fourth group was SB-ADPCM, by NTT and BTRL.

The immediate predecessors of MP3 were Optimum Coding in the Frequency Domain (OCF), and Perceptual Transform Coding (PXFM). These two codecs, along with block-switching contributions from Thomson-Brandt, were merged into a codec named ASPEC, which was submitted to MPEG and won the quality competition, but which was rejected as too complex to implement. The first practical implementation of an audio perceptual coder (OCF) in hardware (Krasner's hardware was too cumbersome and slow for practical use), was an implementation of a psychoacoustic transform coder based on Motorola 56000 digital signal processor (DSP) chips.

Another predecessor of the MP3 format and technology was the perceptual codec MUSICAM based on an integer arithmetic 32-sub-band filter bank, driven by a psychoacoustic model. It was primarily designed for Digital Audio Broadcasting (digital radio) and digital TV, and its basic principles were disclosed to the scientific community by CCETT (France) and IRT (Germany) in Atlanta during an IEEE-ICASSP conference in 1991, after having worked on MUSICAM with Matsushita and Philips since 1989.

This codec, incorporated into a broadcasting system using COFDM modulation, was demonstrated on air and in the field with Radio Canada and CRC Canada during the NAB show (Las Vegas) in 1991. The implementation of the audio part of this broadcasting system was based on a two-chip encoder (one for the subband transform, one for the psychoacoustic model designed by the team of G. Stoll (IRT Germany), later known as psychoacoustic model I) and a real-time decoder using one Motorola 56001 DSP chip running an integer arithmetics software designed by Y.F. Dehery's team (CCETT, France). The simplicity of the corresponding decoder together with the high audio quality of this codec using for the first time a 48 kHz sampling rate, a 20 bits/sample input format (the highest available sampling standard in 1991, compatible with the AES/EBU professional digital input studio standard) were the main reasons to later adopt the characteristics of MUSICAM as the basic features for an advanced digital music compression codec.

During the development of the MUSICAM encoding software, Stoll and Dehery's team made thorough use of a set of high-quality audio assessment material selected by a group of audio professionals from the European Broadcasting Union, and later used as a reference for the assessment of music compression codecs. The subband coding technique was found to be efficient, not only for the perceptual coding of high-quality sound materials but especially for the encoding of critical percussive sound materials (drums, triangle,...), due to the specific temporal masking effect of the MUSICAM sub-band filterbank (this advantage being a specific feature of short transform coding techniques).

As a doctoral student at Germany's University of Erlangen-Nuremberg, Karlheinz Brandenburg began working on digital music compression in the early 1980s, focusing on how people perceive music. He completed his doctoral work in 1989. MP3 is directly descended from OCF and PXFM, representing the outcome of the collaboration of Brandenburg — working as a postdoctoral researcher at AT&T-Bell Labs with James D. Johnston ("JJ") of AT&T-Bell Labs — with the Fraunhofer Institute for Integrated Circuits, Erlangen (where he worked with Bernhard Grill and four other researchers – "The Original Six"), with relatively minor contributions from the MP2 branch of psychoacoustic sub-band coders. In 1990, Brandenburg became an assistant professor at Erlangen-Nuremberg. While there, he continued to work on music compression with scientists at the Fraunhofer Society's Heinrich Herz Institute. In 1993, he joined the staff of Fraunhofer IIS in Erlangen. An a cappella version of the song "Tom's Diner" by Suzanne Vega was the first song used by Brandenburg to develop the MP3 format. It was used as a benchmark to see how well MP3's compression algorithm handled the human voice. Brandenburg adopted the song for testing purposes, listening to it again and again each time he refined the compression algorithm, making sure it did not adversely affect the reproduction of Vega's voice. Accordingly, he dubbed Vega the "Mother of MP3".

=== Standardization ===
In 1991, two available proposals were assessed for an MPEG audio standard: MUSICAM (Masking pattern adapted Universal Subband Integrated Coding And Multiplexing) and ASPEC (Adaptive Spectral Perceptual Entropy Coding). The MUSICAM technique, proposed by Philips (Netherlands), CCETT (France), the Institute for Broadcast Technology (Germany), and Matsushita (Japan), was chosen due to its simplicity and error robustness, as well as for its high level of computational efficiency. The MUSICAM format, based on sub-band coding, became the basis for the MPEG Audio compression format, incorporating, for example, its frame structure, header format, sample rates, etc.

While much of MUSICAM technology and ideas were incorporated into the definition of MPEG Audio Layer I and Layer II, the filter bank alone and the data structure based on 1152 samples framing (file format and byte-oriented stream) of MUSICAM remained in the Layer III (MP3) format, as part of the computationally inefficient hybrid filter bank. Under the chairmanship of Professor Musmann of the Leibniz University Hannover, the editing of the standard was delegated to Leon van de Kerkhof (Netherlands), Gerhard Stoll (Germany), and Yves-François Dehery (France), who worked on Layer I and Layer II. ASPEC was the joint proposal of AT&T Bell Laboratories, Thomson Consumer Electronics, Fraunhofer Society, and CNET. It provided the highest coding efficiency.

A working group consisting of van de Kerkhof, Stoll, Leonardo Chiariglione (CSELT VP for Media), Yves-François Dehery, Karlheinz Brandenburg (Germany) and James D. Johnston (United States) took ideas from ASPEC, integrated the filter bank from Layer II, added some of their ideas such as the joint stereo coding of MUSICAM and created the MP3 format, which was designed to achieve the same quality at 128 kbit/s as MP2 at 192 kbit/s.

The algorithms for MPEG-1 Audio Layer I, II and III were approved in 1991 and finalized in 1992 as part of MPEG-1, the first standard suite by MPEG, which resulted in the international standard ISO/IEC 11172-3 (a.k.a. MPEG-1 Audio or MPEG-1 Part 3), published in 1993. Files or data streams conforming to this standard must handle sample rates of 48k, 44100, and 32k and continue to be supported by current MP3 players and decoders. Thus the first generation of MP3 defined 14 × 3 = 42 interpretations of MP3 frame data structures and size layouts.

The compression efficiency of encoders is typically defined by the bit rate because the compression ratio depends on the bit depth and sampling rate of the input signal. Nevertheless, compression ratios are often published. They may use the compact disc (CD) parameters as references (44.1 kHz, 2 channels at 16 bits per channel or 2×16 bit), or sometimes the Digital Audio Tape (DAT) SP parameters (48 kHz, 2×16 bit). Compression ratios with this latter reference are higher, which demonstrates the problem with the use of the term compression ratio for lossy encoders.

Brandenburg used a CD recording of Suzanne Vega's song "Tom's Diner" to assess and refine the MP3 compression algorithm. This song was chosen because of its nearly monophonic nature and wide spectral content, making it easier to hear imperfections in the compression format during playbacks. This particular track has an interesting property in that the two channels are almost, but not completely, the same, leading to a case where Binaural Masking Level Depression causes spatial unmasking of noise artifacts unless the encoder properly recognizes the situation and applies corrections similar to those detailed in the MPEG-2 AAC psychoacoustic model. Some more critical audio excerpts (glockenspiel, triangle, accordion, etc.) were taken from the EBU V3/SQAM reference compact disc and have been used by professional sound engineers to assess the subjective quality of the MPEG Audio formats.

=== Going public ===
A reference simulation software implementation, written in the C language and later known as ISO 11172-5, was developed (in 1991–1996) by the members of the ISO MPEG Audio committee to produce bit-compliant MPEG Audio files (Layer 1, Layer 2, Layer 3). It was approved as a committee draft of the ISO/IEC technical report in March 1994 and printed as document CD 11172-5 in April 1994. It was approved as a draft technical report (DTR/DIS) in November 1994, finalized in 1996 and published as international standard ISO/IEC TR 11172-5:1998 in 1998. The reference software in C language was later published as a freely available ISO standard. Working in non-real time on several operating systems, it was able to demonstrate the first real-time hardware decoding (DSP based) of compressed audio. Some other real-time implementations of MPEG Audio encoders and decoders were available for digital broadcasting (radio DAB, television DVB) towards consumer receivers and set-top boxes.

On 7 July 1994, the Fraunhofer Society released the first software MP3 encoder, named l3enc. The filename extension .mp3 was chosen by the Fraunhofer team on 14 July 1995 (the files had formerly been named .bit). With the first real-time software MP3 player WinPlay3 (released 9 September 1995) many people were able to encode and play back MP3 files on their PCs. Because of the relatively small hard drives of the era (≈500–1000 MB) lossy compression was essential to store multiple albums' worth of music on a home computer as full recordings (as opposed to MIDI notation, or tracker files which combined notation with short recordings of instruments playing single notes).

==== Internet spreading ====
A hacker nicknamed SoloH found the source code of the dist10 MPEG reference implementation on the servers of the University of Erlangen shortly after the release. He integrated it within a graphical interface, enabling easy conversion from CD or WAV files, and spread it on the internet. This software started the widespread CD ripping and digital music distribution as MP3 over the internet.

=== Further versions ===
MPEG Audio Layer III versions
Version	International Standard^{[*]}	First edition public release date	Latest edition public release date
MPEG-1 Audio Layer III	ISO/IEC 11172-3 (MPEG-1 Part 3)	1993	
MPEG-2 Audio Layer III	ISO/IEC 13818-3 (MPEG-2 Part 3)	1995	1998
MPEG-2.5 Audio Layer III	nonstandard, Fraunhofer proprietary	2000	2008

^{*} The ISO standard ISO/IEC 11172-3 (a.k.a. MPEG-1 Audio) defined three formats: the MPEG-1 Audio Layer I, Layer II and Layer III. The ISO standard ISO/IEC 13818-3 (a.k.a. MPEG-2 Audio) defined an extended version of MPEG-1 Audio: MPEG-2 Audio Layer I, Layer II, and Layer III. MPEG-2 Audio (MPEG-2 Part 3) should not be confused with MPEG-2 AAC (MPEG-2 Part 7 – ISO/IEC 13818-7).

==== MPEG-2 ====
Further work on MPEG audio was finalized in 1994 as part of the second suite of MPEG standards, MPEG-2, more formally known as international standard ISO/IEC 13818-3 (a.k.a. MPEG-2 Part 3 or backward compatible MPEG-2 Audio or MPEG-2 Audio BC), originally published in 1995. MPEG-2 Part 3 (ISO/IEC 13818-3) defined 42 additional bit rates and sample rates for MPEG-1 Audio Layer I, II and III. The new sampling rates are exactly half that of those originally defined in MPEG-1 Audio. This reduction in sampling rates serves to cut the available frequency fidelity in half while likewise cutting the bit rate by 50%. MPEG-2 Part 3 also enhanced MPEG-1's audio by allowing the coding of audio programs with more than two channels, up to 5.1 multichannel, even though to this date no encoder is known to have used this feature.

==== MPEG-2.5 ====
A third generation of MP3-style data streams (files) extended the MPEG-2 ideas and implementation but was named MPEG-2.5 audio since MPEG-3 already had a different meaning. This extension was developed at Fraunhofer IIS by reducing the frame sync field in the MP3 header from 12 to 11 bits. As in the transition from MPEG-1 to MPEG-2, MPEG-2.5 adds more sampling rates exactly half of those available using MPEG-2. It thus widens the scope of MP3 to include human speech and other applications yet requires only 25% of the bandwidth (frequency reproduction) possible using MPEG-1 sampling rates. While not an ISO-recognized standard, MPEG-2.5 is widely supported by most digital audio players and computer software-based MP3 encoders (LAME), decoders (FFmpeg), and players (MPC), adding 3 × 8 = 24 additional MP3 frame types. Each generation of MP3 thus supports 3 sampling rates, exactly half that of the prior generation for a total of 9 variations of MP3 format files. The sample rate comparison table between MPEG-1, 2, and 2.5 is given later in the article. MPEG-2.5 is supported by LAME (since 2000), Media Player Classic (MPC), iTunes, and FFmpeg.

MPEG-2.5 was not developed by MPEG (see above) and was never approved as an international standard. MPEG-2.5 is thus an unofficial or proprietary extension to the MP3 format. It is nonetheless ubiquitous and especially advantageous for low-bit-rate human speech applications.

=== Internet distribution ===
In the second half of the 1990s, MP3 files began to spread on the Internet, often via underground pirated song networks. The first known experiment in Internet distribution was organized in the early 1990s by the Internet Underground Music Archive, better known by the acronym IUMA. After some experiments using uncompressed audio files, this archive started to deliver on the native worldwide low-speed Internet some compressed MPEG Audio files using the MP2 (Layer II) format and later on used MP3 files when the standard was fully completed. The popularity of MP3s began to rise rapidly with the advent of Nullsoft's audio player Winamp, released in 1997, which still had in 2023 a community of 80 million active users. In 1998, Windows Media Player 5.2 and later added support for MP3 format, and the first portable solid-state digital audio player MPMan, developed by SaeHan Information Systems, which is headquartered in Seoul, South Korea, was released and the Rio PMP300 was sold afterward in 1998, despite legal suppression efforts by the RIAA.

In November 1997, the website mp3.com was offering thousands of MP3s created by independent artists for free. The small size of MP3 files enabled widespread peer-to-peer file sharing of music ripped from CDs, which would have formerly been nearly impossible. The first large peer-to-peer file-sharing network, Napster, was launched in 1999. The ease of creating and sharing MP3s resulted in widespread copyright infringement. Major record companies argued that this free sharing of music reduced sales, and called it "music piracy". They reacted by pursuing lawsuits against Napster, which was eventually shut down and later sold, and against individual users who engaged in file sharing. Napster later returned as a legitimate music streaming service.

Unauthorized MP3 file sharing continues on next-generation peer-to-peer networks. Authorized services, such as Amazon.com, Beatport, Bleep, eMusic, Juno Records, and the reincarnated Napster, sell unrestricted music in the MP3 format.

== Design ==
=== File structure ===
Diagram of the structure of an MP3 file (MPEG version 2.5, not described here, changes the last bit of sync word to 0 as an indication, effectively moving one bit to the version field.)

An MP3 file is made up of MP3 frames, which consist of a header and a data block. This sequence of frames is called an elementary stream. Due to the bit reservoir, frames are not independent items and cannot usually be extracted on arbitrary frame boundaries. The MP3 Data blocks contain the (compressed) audio information in terms of frequencies and amplitudes. The diagram shows that the MP3 Header consists of a sync word, which is used to identify the beginning of a valid frame. This is followed by a bit indicating that this is the MPEG standard and two bits that indicate that layer 3 is used; hence MPEG-1 Audio Layer 3 or MP3. After this, the values will differ, depending on the MP3 file. ISO/IEC 11172-3 defines the range of values for each section of the header along with the specification of the header. Most MP3 files today contain ID3 metadata, which precedes or follows the MP3 frames, as noted in the diagram. The data stream can contain an optional checksum.

Joint stereo is done only on a frame-to-frame basis.

=== Encoding and decoding ===
In short, MP3 compression works by reducing the accuracy of certain components of sound that are considered (by psychoacoustic analysis) to be beyond the hearing capabilities of most humans. This method is commonly referred to as perceptual coding or psychoacoustic modeling. The remaining audio information is then recorded in a space-efficient manner using MDCT and FFT algorithms.

The MP3 encoding algorithm is generally split into four parts. Part 1 divides the audio signal into smaller pieces, called frames, and an MDCT filter is then performed on the output. Part 2 passes the sample into a 1024-point fast Fourier transform (FFT), then the psychoacoustic model is applied and another MDCT filter is performed on the output. Part 3 quantifies and encodes each sample, known as noise allocation, which adjusts itself to meet the bit rate and sound masking requirements. Part 4 formats the bitstream, called an audio frame, which is made up of 4 parts, the header, error check, audio data, and ancillary data.

MP3 uses an overlapping MDCT structure. Each MPEG-1 MP3 frame is 1152 samples, divided into two granules of 576 samples. These 576 consecutive samples, initially in the time domain, are transformed in one block to 576 frequency-domain samples by MDCT. MP3 also allows the use of shorter blocks in a granule, down to a size of 192 samples; this feature is used when a transient is detected. Doing so limits the temporal spread of quantization noise accompanying the transient (see psychoacoustics). Frequency resolution is limited by the small long block window size, which decreases coding efficiency. Time resolution can be too low for highly transient signals and may cause smearing of percussive sounds.

Due to the tree structure of the filter bank, pre-echo problems are made worse, as the combined impulse response of the two filter banks does not, and cannot, provide an optimum solution in time/frequency resolution. Additionally, the combining of the two filter banks' outputs creates aliasing problems that must be handled partially by the aliasing compensation stage; however, that creates excess energy to be coded in the frequency domain, thereby decreasing coding efficiency.

Decoding, on the other hand, is carefully defined in the standard. Most decoders are bitstream compliant, which means that the decompressed output that they produce from a given MP3 file will be the same, within a specified degree of rounding tolerance, as the output specified mathematically in the ISO/IEC high standard document (ISO/IEC 11172-3). Therefore, the comparison of decoders is usually based on how computationally efficient they are (i.e., how much memory or CPU time they use in the decoding process). Over time this concern has become less of an issue as CPU clock rates transitioned from MHz to GHz. Encoder/decoder overall delay is not defined, which means there is no official provision for gapless playback. However, some encoders such as LAME can attach additional metadata that will allow players that can handle it to deliver seamless playback.

=== Quality ===
When performing lossy audio encoding, such as creating an MP3 data stream, there is a trade-off between the amount of data generated and the sound quality of the results. The person generating an MP3 selects a bit rate, which specifies how many kilobits per second of audio is desired. The higher the bit rate, the larger the MP3 data stream will be, and, generally, the closer it will sound to the original recording. With too low a bit rate, compression artifacts (i.e., sounds that were not present in the original recording) may be audible in the reproduction. Some audio is hard to compress because of its randomness and sharp attacks. When this type of audio is compressed, artifacts such as ringing or pre-echo are usually heard. A sample of applause or a triangle instrument with a relatively low bit rate provides good examples of compression artifacts. Most subjective testings of perceptual codecs tend to avoid using these types of sound materials; however, the artifacts generated by percussive sounds are barely perceptible due to the specific temporal masking feature of the 32-sub-band filterbank of Layer II on which the format is based.

The MPEG-1 standard does not include a precise specification for an MP3 encoder but does provide examples of psychoacoustic models, rate loops, and the like in the non-normative part of the original standard. When this was written, the suggested implementations were quite dated. Implementers of the standard were supposed to devise algorithms suitable for removing parts of the information from the audio input. As a result, many different MP3 encoders became available, each producing files of differing quality. Comparisons were widely available, so it was easy for a prospective user of an encoder to research the best choice. Some encoders that were proficient at encoding at higher bit rates (such as LAME) were not necessarily as good at lower bit rates.

Besides the bit rate of an encoded piece of audio, the quality of MP3-encoded sound also depends on the quality of the encoder algorithm as well as the complexity of the signal being encoded. As the MP3 standard allows quite a bit of freedom with encoding algorithms, different encoders do feature quite different quality, even with identical bit rates. As an example, in a public listening test featuring two early MP3 encoders set at about 128 kbit/s, one scored 3.66 on a 1–5 scale, while the other scored only 2.22. Quality is dependent on the choice of encoder and encoding parameters.

This observation caused a revolution in audio encoding. Early on bit rate was the prime and only consideration. At the time, MP3 files were of the very simplest type: they used the same bit rate for the entire file; this process is known as constant bit rate (CBR) encoding. Using a constant bit rate makes encoding simpler and less CPU-intensive. However, it is also possible to optimize the size of the file by creating files where the bit rate changes throughout the file. These are known as variable bit rate. The bit reservoir and VBR encoding were part of the original MPEG-1 standard. The concept behind them is that, in any piece of audio, some sections are easier to compress, such as silence or music containing only a few tones, while others will be more difficult to compress. So, the overall quality of the file may be increased by using a lower bit rate for the less complex passages and a higher one for the more complex parts. With some advanced MP3 encoders, it is possible to specify a given quality, and the encoder will adjust the bit rate accordingly. Users that desire a particular "quality setting" that is transparent to their ears can use this value when encoding all of their music, and generally speaking not need to worry about performing personal listening tests on each piece of music to determine the correct bit rate.

Perceived quality can be influenced by the listening environment (ambient noise), listener attention, listener training, and in most cases by listener audio equipment (such as sound cards, speakers, and headphones). Furthermore, sufficient quality may be achieved by a lower-quality setting for lectures and human speech applications, reducing encoding time and complexity. A test given to new students by Stanford University Music Professor Jonathan Berger showed that student preference for MP3-quality music has risen each year. Berger said the students seem to prefer the 'sizzle' sounds that MP3s bring to music.

An in-depth study of MP3 audio quality, sound artist and composer Ryan Maguire's project "The Ghost in the MP3" isolates the sounds lost during MP3 compression. In 2015, he released the track "moDernisT" (an anagram of "Tom's Diner"), composed exclusively from the sounds deleted during MP3 compression of the song "Tom's Diner", the track originally used in the formulation of the MP3 standard. A detailed account of the techniques used to isolate the sounds deleted during MP3 compression, along with the conceptual motivation for the project, was published in the 2014 Proceedings of the International Computer Music Conference.

=== Bit rate and sampling rates ===
MPEG Audio Layer III available bit rates (kbit/s)
MPEG-1 Audio Layer III	MPEG-2 Audio Layer III	MPEG-2.5 Audio Layer III
–	8	8
–	16	16
–	24	24
32	32	32
40	40	40
48	48	48
56	56	56
64	64	64
80	80	–
96	96	–
112	112	–
128	128	–
–	144	–
160	160	–
192	–	–
224	–	–
256	–	–
320	–	–

Supported sampling rates by MPEG Audio Format
MPEG-1 Audio Layer III	MPEG-2 Audio Layer III	MPEG-2.5 Audio Layer III
–	–	8 kHz
–	–	11.025 kHz
–	–	12 kHz
–	16 kHz	–
–	22.05 kHz	–
–	24 kHz	–
32 kHz	–	–
44.1 kHz	–	–
48 kHz	–	–

Bit rate, technically data rate, usually measured in bits per second, is linked, when encoding audio data, to the sample size (the number of bits per audio sample) and sampling rate: CD audio is encoded with simple pulse-code modulation using 16-bit samples, 44100 of them per second, for each of two channels (left and right). So, multiplying 44100 samples per second by 16 bits per sample by 2 channels gives 1411200 bits per second—the data rate of uncompressed CD digital audio. MP3 was designed to encode this 1411 kbit/s raw data at 320 kbit/s or less. If less complex passages are detected by the MP3 algorithms then lower bit rates may be employed.

As shown in these two tables:

- 14 selected bit rates are allowed in MPEG-1 Audio Layer III standard: 32, 40, 48, 56, 64, 80, 96, 112, 128, 160, 192, 224, 256 and 320 kbit/s, along with the 3 highest available sampling rates of 32, 44.1 and 48 kHz.
- MPEG-2 Audio Layer III also allows 14 globally lower bit rates of 8, 16, 24, 32, 40, 48, 56, 64, 80, 96, 112, 128, 144, 160 kbit/s with sampling rates of 16, 22.05 and 24 kHz which are exactly half that of MPEG-1.
- MPEG-2.5 Audio Layer III frames are limited to only 8 bit rates of 8, 16, 24, 32, 40, 48, 56 and 64 kbit/s with 3 even lower sampling rates of 8, 11.025, and 12 kHz..

Earlier systems also lack fast forwarding and rewinding playback controls on MP3.

MPEG-1 frames contain the most detail in 320 kbit/s mode, the highest allowable bit rate setting, with silence and simple tones still requiring 32 kbit/s. MPEG-2 frames can capture up to 12 kHz sound reproduction, requiring up to 160 kbit/s.

A sample rate of 44.1 kHz is commonly used for music reproduction because this is also used for CD audio, the main source used for creating MP3 files. A great variety of bit rates are used on the Internet. A bit rate of 128 kbit/s is commonly used, at a compression ratio of 11:1, offering adequate audio quality in a relatively small space. As Internet bandwidth availability and hard drive sizes have increased, higher bit rates up to 320 kbit/s are widespread. Uncompressed audio as stored on an audio-CD has a bit rate of 1,411.2 kbit/s, (16 bit/sample × 44,100 samples/second × 2 channels / 1,000 bits/kilobit), so the bit rates 128, 160, and 192 kbit/s represent compression ratios of approximately 11:1, 9:1 and 7:1 respectively.

Non-standard bit rates up to 640 kbit/s can be achieved with the LAME encoder and the free format option, although few MP3 players can play those files. According to the ISO standard, decoders are only required to be able to decode streams up to 320 kbit/s. Early MPEG Layer III encoders used what is now called constant bit rate (CBR). The software was only able to use a uniform bit rate on all frames in an MP3 file. Later, more sophisticated MP3 encoders were able to use the bit reservoir to target an average bit rate, selecting the encoding rate for each frame based on the complexity of the sound in that portion of the recording.

A more sophisticated MP3 encoder can produce variable bit rate audio. MPEG audio may use bit rate switching on a per-frame basis, but only layer III decoders must support it. VBR is used when the goal is to achieve a fixed level of quality. The final file size of a VBR encoding is less predictable than with constant bit rate. Average bit rate is a type of VBR implemented as a compromise between the two: the bit rate is allowed to vary for more consistent quality, but is controlled to remain near an average value chosen by the user, for predictable file sizes. Although an MP3 decoder must support VBR to be standards compliant, historically some decoders have bugs with VBR decoding, particularly before VBR encoders became widespread.

The MPEG standard allows bitrates up to 320 kbit/s, but due to an oversight in the MP3 specification, using 320 kbit/s (including 320 kbit/s frames in a VBR file) at the standard CD sample rate of 44.1 kHz creates frames that are larger than the standard allows. Most players will still play these files. The highest bitrate at 44.1 kHz that is strictly within the standard is 256 kbit/s. This is not an issue at 48 kHz, as the frame size remains just within the limits. For MPEG-1, the limit is 7680 bits per frame, which is the size of a 48 KHz frame at 320 kbps.

Layer III audio can also use a bit reservoir, a partially full frame's ability to hold part of the next frame's audio data, allowing temporary changes in effective bit rate, even in a constant bit rate stream. Internal handling of the bit reservoir increases encoding delay. There is no scale factor band 21 (sfb21) for frequencies above approx 16 kHz, forcing the encoder to choose between less accurate representation in band 21 or less efficient storage in all bands below band 21, the latter resulting in wasted bit rate in VBR encoding.

=== Ancillary data ===
The ancillary data field can be used to store user-defined data. The ancillary data is optional and the number of bits available is not explicitly given. The ancillary data is located after the Huffman code bits and ranges to where the next frame's main_data_begin points to. The encoder mp3PRO used ancillary data to encode extra information that could improve audio quality when decoded with its algorithm.

=== Metadata ===
A tag in an audio file is a section of the file that contains metadata such as the title, artist, album, track number, or other information about the file's contents. The MP3 standards do not define tag formats for MP3 files, nor is there a standard container format that would support metadata and obviate the need for tags. However, several de facto standards for tag formats exist. As of 2010, the most widespread are ID3v1 and ID3v2, and the more recently introduced APEv2. These tags are normally embedded at the beginning or end of MP3 files, separate from the actual MP3 frame data. MP3 decoders either extract information from the tags or just treat them as ignorable, non-MP3 junk data.

Playing and editing software often contains tag editing functionality, but there are also tag editor applications dedicated to the purpose. Aside from metadata about the audio content, tags may also be used for DRM. ReplayGain is a standard for measuring and storing the loudness of an MP3 file (audio normalization) in its metadata tag, enabling a ReplayGain-compliant player to automatically adjust the overall playback volume for each file. MP3Gain may be used to reversibly modify files based on ReplayGain measurements so that adjusted playback can be achieved on players without ReplayGain capability.

== Licensing, ownership, and legislation ==
The basic MP3 decoding and encoding technology is patent-free in the European Union, all patents having expired there by 2012 at the latest. In the United States, the technology became substantially patent-free on 16 April 2017 (see below). MP3 patents expired in the US between 2007 and 2017. In the past, many organizations have claimed ownership of patents related to MP3 decoding or encoding. These claims led to several legal threats and actions from a variety of sources. As a result, in countries that allow software patents, uncertainty about which patents must have been licensed to create MP3 products without committing patent infringement was common in the early stages of the technology's adoption.

The initial near-complete MPEG-1 standard (parts 1, 2, and 3) was publicly available on 6 December 1991 as ISO CD 11172. In most countries, patents cannot be filed after prior art has been made public, and patents expire 20 years after the initial filing date, which can be up to 12 months later for filings in other countries. As a result, patents required to implement MP3 expired in most countries by December 2012, 21 years after the publication of ISO CD 11172.

An exception is the United States, where patents in force but filed before 8 June 1995 expire after the later of 17 years from the issue date or 20 years from the priority date. A lengthy patent prosecution process may result in a patent issued much later than normally expected (see submarine patents). The various MP3-related patents expired on dates ranging from 2007 to 2017 in the United States. Patents for anything disclosed in ISO CD 11172 filed a year or more after its publication are questionable. If only the known MP3 patents filed by December 1992 are considered, then MP3 decoding has been patent-free in the US since 22 September 2015, when U.S. patent 5,812,672, which had a PCT filing in October 1992, expired. If the longest-running patent mentioned in the aforementioned references is taken as a measure, then the MP3 technology became patent-free in the United States on 16 April 2017, when U.S. patent 6,009,399, held and administered by Technicolor, expired. As a result, many free and open-source software projects, such as the Fedora Linux operating system, have decided to start shipping MP3 support by default, and users will no longer have to resort to installing unofficial packages maintained by third party software repositories for MP3 playback or encoding.

Technicolor (formerly named Thomson Consumer Electronics) claimed to control MP3 licensing of the Layer 3 patents in many countries, including the United States, Japan, Canada, and EU countries. Technicolor had been actively enforcing these patents. MP3 license revenues from Technicolor's administration generated about €100 million for the Fraunhofer Society in 2005. In September 1998, the Fraunhofer Institute sent a letter to several developers of MP3 software stating that a license was required to "distribute and/or sell decoders and/or encoders". The letter claimed that unlicensed products "infringe the patent rights of Fraunhofer and Thomson. To make, sell or distribute products using the [MPEG Layer-3] standard and thus our patents, you need to obtain a license under these patents from us." This led to the situation where the LAME MP3 encoder project could not offer its users official binaries that could run on their computers. The project's position was that as source code, LAME was simply a description of how an MP3 encoder could be implemented. Unofficially, compiled binaries were available from other sources.

Sisvel S.p.A., a Luxembourg-based company, administers licenses for patents applying to MPEG Audio. They, along with its United States subsidiary Audio MPEG, Inc. had previously sued Thomson for patent infringement on MP3 technology, but those disputes were resolved in November 2005 with Sisvel granting Thomson a license to their patents. Motorola followed soon after and signed with Sisvel to license MP3-related patents in December 2005. Except for three patents, the US patents administered by Sisvel had all expired in 2015. The three exceptions are: U.S. patent 5,878,080, expired February 2017; U.S. patent 5,850,456, expired February 2017; and U.S. patent 5,960,037, expired 9 April 2017. As of around the first quarter of 2023, Sisvel's licensing program has become a legacy.

In September 2006, German officials seized MP3 players from SanDisk's booth at the IFA show in Berlin after an Italian patents firm won an injunction on behalf of Sisvel against SanDisk in a dispute over licensing rights. The injunction was later reversed by a Berlin judge, but that reversal was in turn blocked the same day by another judge from the same court, "bringing the Patent Wild West to Germany" in the words of one commentator. In February 2007, Texas MP3 Technologies sued Apple, Samsung Electronics and Sandisk in eastern Texas federal court, claiming infringement of a portable MP3 player patent that Texas MP3 said it had been assigned. Apple, Samsung, and Sandisk all settled the claims against them in January 2009.

Alcatel-Lucent has asserted several MP3 coding and compression patents, allegedly inherited from AT&T-Bell Labs, in litigation of its own. In November 2006, before the companies' merger, Alcatel sued Microsoft for allegedly infringing seven patents. On 23 February 2007, a San Diego jury awarded Alcatel-Lucent US $1.52 billion in damages for infringement of two of them. The court subsequently revoked the award, however, finding that one patent had not been infringed and that the other was not owned by Alcatel-Lucent; it was co-owned by AT&T and Fraunhofer, who had licensed it to Microsoft, the judge ruled. That defense judgment was upheld on appeal in 2008.

== Alternative technologies ==
Comparison between MP3 and Vorbis
The first is uncompressed WAV file. The second is a Vorbis file encoded at 48 kbit/s, and third is an MP3 encoded at 48 kbit/s using LAME.

Other lossy formats exist. Among these, Advanced Audio Coding (AAC) is the most widely used, and was designed to be the successor to MP3. There also exist other lossy formats such as mp3PRO and MP2. They are members of the same technological family as MP3 and depend on roughly similar psychoacoustic models and MDCT algorithms. Whereas MP3 uses a hybrid coding approach that is part MDCT and part FFT, AAC is purely MDCT, significantly improving compression efficiency. Many of the basic patents underlying these formats are held by Fraunhofer Society, Alcatel-Lucent, Thomson Consumer Electronics, Bell, Dolby, LG Electronics, NEC, NTT Docomo, Panasonic, Sony, ETRI, JVC Kenwood, Philips, Microsoft, and NTT.

Microsoft created and promoted their own competing standard, Windows Media Audio (WMA) with the claim that it is better than MP3. When the digital audio player market was taking off, MP3 was widely adopted as the standard hence the popular name MP3 player. Sony was an exception and used their own ATRAC codec taken from their MiniDisc format, which Sony claimed was better. Following criticism and lower than expected Walkman sales, in 2004 Sony for the first time introduced native MP3 support to its Walkman players.

There are also open compression formats like Opus and Vorbis (OGG) that are available free of charge and without any known patent restrictions.

Besides lossy compression methods, lossless formats are a significant alternative to MP3 because they provide unaltered audio content, though with an increased file size compared to lossy compression. Lossless formats include FLAC (Free Lossless Audio Codec), Apple Lossless and many others.

== See also ==
- MP3 Surround
- Windows Media Audio (WMA)
- Comparison of audio coding formats
