= TMPGEnc =

Video transcoder software application

TMPGEnc Video Mastering Works
- Developer(s): Pegasys Inc.
- Initial release: June 2019; 6 years ago
- Stable release: 7.0.28.31 / June 27, 2023; 2 years ago
- Operating system: Microsoft Windows
- Platform: x86/X64
- Available in: English, German, Japanese
- Type: Video encoder
- License: Shareware
- Website: tmpgenc.pegasys-inc.com/en/index.html

TMPGEnc Free Version
- Developer(s): Pegasys Inc.
- Initial release: November 2001; 23 years ago
- Final release: 2.525.64.184 / September 2, 2008; 17 years ago
- Operating system: Microsoft Windows
- Platform: x86
- Available in: English, Japanese, German, French, Chinese
- Type: Video encoder
- License: Freeware, Shareware
- Website: www.tmpgenc.net

TMPGEnc or TSUNAMI MPEG Encoder is a video transcoder software application primarily for encoding video files to VCD and SVCD-compliant MPEG video formats and was developed by Hiroyuki Hori and Pegasys Inc. TMPGEnc can also refer to the family of software video encoders created after the success of the original TMPGEnc encoder. These include: TMPGEnc Plus, TMPGEnc Free Version, TMPGenc Video Mastering Works, TMPGEnc Authoring Works, TMPGEnc MovieStyle and TMPGEnc MPEG Editor. TMPGEnc products run on Microsoft Windows.

The free trial version of TMPGEnc Video Mastering works has a 14-day time limit. The TMPGEnc Free Version has 30-day time limit for MPEG-2 encoding, MPEG-1 encoding is without limit, but it can be used only for non-commercial, personal or demonstration purposes.

== History ==
The first beta versions of the TMPGEnc encoder were freely available in 2000 and 2001 and were known as Tsunami MPEG Encoder. The first "stable" version was TMPGEnc 2.00, released on 2001-11-01. In December 2001, sales of "TMPGEnc Plus" started in Japan. In January 2002, the "TMPGEnc Plus - English version" was released. In August 2002, TMPGEnc DVD Source Creator was released and bundled with Sony "Vaio" PC in Japan. In April 2003, "TMPGEnc DVD Author - English version" was released. In March 2005, Tsunami MPEG Video Encoder XPress was released. In August 2005, "TSUNAMI" and "TMPGEnc" were combined into one brand.

TMPGEnc Plus/TMPGEnc Free Version was often rated as one of the best-quality MPEG-1/MPEG-2 encoders, alongside Canopus ProCoder and Cinema Craft Encoder. The popularity of TMPGEnc encoders has spawned various other products and "TMPGEnc" is now used as a general brand name for products such TMPGEnc Authoring Works (a consumer-grade Blu-ray Disc, DVD, and DivX authoring tool), TMPGEnc MovieStyle (a video converter primarily for portable and set-top devices), and TMPGEnc MPEG Editor (an MPEG editing program). TMPGEnc Plus is currently still sold by Pegasys Inc., alongside TMPGEnc Video Mastering Works, TMPGEnc Authoring Works, TMPGEnc MovieStyle, TMPGEnc MPEG Editor, TMPGEnc Instant Show Presenter, and TMPGEnc KARMA..Plus. The TMPGEnc Free Version was updated in 2008 for compatibility with Windows Vista (SP1 included).

== Technical details ==
TMPGEnc Plus in first releases provided advanced MPEG-1 and MPEG-2 video encoding with various technical options, MPEG-1 Layer II and Layer I audio encoding, support for external audio encoders (such as toolame, l3enc, mp3enc, LAME), internal video filters (such as deinterlacing), support for various input formats (AVI, MPEG, WAV, sequence JPEG, TGA files, etc.) depending on installed DirectShow filters, VFAPI frameserver support, support for AVI, WAV, BMP, TGA output and other features. TMPGEnc encoders can read most video formats, as long as the appropriate DirectShow filters are installed in the system. TMPGEnc Plus and TMPGEnc Free Version include tool named "MPEG Tools", which is a simple multiplexer and demultiplexer for MPEG containers (MPEG program stream).

TMPGEnc Video Mastering Works also provides HD MPEG-4 AVC/H.264 output support, Blu-ray Disc output support, AVCHD input support, DVD-Video and DVD-VR input support, MKV input and output support, FLV input, etc. It is the first TMPGEnc product to incorporate the x264 encoding engine for MPEG-4 AVC/H.264 output and is the first software product to commercially license the x264 encoder. New to TMPGEnc Video Mastering Works 6 over previous versions is H.265/HEVC encoding support (4K and 8K), H.264/AVC 10-bit format (4:2:2 and 4:4:4) output support, and more.

== See also ==
- List of video editing software
