= CDVD =

CDs with MPEG video

cDVD ("Compact DVD") discs, also known as mini-DVD discs (not to be confused with 8 cm DVDs), are regular data CDs that contain MPEG-2 or MPEG-1 video structured in accordance with the DVD-Video specifications (such as a VIDEO_TS directory containing properly authored IFO/BUP and VOB files, typically on a Mode 1 data track formatted with the UDF 1.02 filesystem).

In the early 2000s, CD recorders and their discs were significantly more available and inexpensive than DVD-R equipment, promoting demand for miniDVD; however, DVD-Video content on other media does not conform to specifications.

When using full resolution video and a single AC-3 soundtrack at typical medium quality encoding settings, a 74 minute (650 MB) CD-R can hold approximately 10 to 15 minutes of material, increasing to about 45 minutes at rather lower quality.

By using non-standard resolutions, long GOPs, more B-frames, and high-compression quantization matrices, it is possible to store up to 2 hours of video with audio and subtitles on a regular 80-minute CD.

Until 2003, few standalone DVD players supported the format, due to firmware limitations and/or not having drives capable of reading a CD at the 9x rate needed to keep up with the maximum bitrate allowed in DVD-Video content, but today, many models contain drives similar to those used on desktop computers, and more versatile firmware as well, so that the proper playback of compact DVDs is often supported, but rarely documented (especially in North America and Europe).

== See also ==
- Video CD (VCD) and Super Video CD (SVCD) – standards for video on CDs
- BD9 & BD5 – Blu-ray Disc Movie content on DVDs, explicitly allowed by the Blu-ray standard
- AVCHD – a digital video specification loosely based on BDMV which can also be played from Blu-ray and non-Blu-ray sources
- MiniDVD – 8 cm DVDs
