= CCETT =

CCETT may refer to:

- Caribbean Centre of Excellence for Teacher Training in Belize
- Centre commun d'études de télévision et télécommunications, a research institute in Rennes, France
- Connecticut Center for Educational and Training Technologies in the U.S. state of Connecticut
