= MPEG Multichannel =

Audio standard

MPEG Multichannel logo

MPEG Empowered logo

MPEG Multichannel, also known as MPEG-2 Backwards Compatible, or MPEG-2 BC, is an extension to the MPEG-1 Layer II audio compression specification, as defined in the MPEG-2 Audio standard (ISO/IEC 13818-3) which allows it provide up to 5.1-channels (surround sound) of audio. To maintain backwards compatibility with the older 2-channel (stereo) audio specification, it uses a channel matrixing scheme, where the additional channels are mixed into the two backwards compatible channels. Extra information in the data stream (ignored by older hardware) contains signals to process extra channels from the matrix.

== Consumer electronics and broadcast use ==
Originally a mandatory part of the DVD specification for PAL standard discs, but was dropped in favor of competitor Dolby Digital in December 1997. This was largely due to delays with MPEG Multichannel encode/decode processes being available for production at the professional level, and a lack of playback products at the consumer level. These issues were later resolved by Fraunhofer IIS with key industry partners such as Koninklijke Philips N.V., but not before MPEG Multichannel lost its mandatory requirement for PAL discs, remaining on only as an optional component. The format is also supported by the Super Video CD (SVCD) disc standard as well. MPEG Multichannel fared better in broadcast adoption and was chosen as part of Japan's CS digital television system.

Other than consumer electronics made exclusively for the Japanese domestic market, native player support for the format is exceedingly rare. Meridian Audio makes the only commercially available surround sound processors outside of Japan that support both MPEG Multichannel and its successor format, MPEG-4 AAC surround described in the 1999 MPEG-2 Part 7 standard. Unlike MPEG Multichannel, Advanced Audio Coding has enjoyed wide industry support in VOD/OTT mediums as well as being the surround coding format used in Japan's BS digital television standard.

In the United States, MPEG Multichannel was proposed for use in the ATSC digital TV broadcasting standard, but Dolby Digital (aka. AC-3, A/52) was chosen instead. This is a matter of significant controversy, as it has been revealed that the organizations (The Massachusetts Institute of Technology and Zenith Electronics) behind 2 of the 4 voting board members received tens of millions of dollars of compensation from secret deals with Dolby Laboratories in exchange for their votes.

MPEG Multichannel–compatible equipment would bear either the MPEG Multichannel or MPEG Empowered logos, or on its packaging and documentation.

== See also ==
- MPEG-1
- MPEG-2
- Super Video CD
- DVD
- TooLAME
