= Hydrogenaudio =

Online community of audio enthusiasts

- Website type: web forum
- Available in: english
- Website: hydrogenaudio.org
- Commercial: No
- Registration: optional
- Users: 112,907
- Launched: 2001; 25 years ago

Hydrogenaudio is an online community of audio enthusiasts, including some software developers. It is known for its blind listening tests and scientific mindset. It has a website with forums featuring discussions about all kinds of audio reproduction issues. There is also a wiki with articles about codecs and other aspects of audio technology. The website was launched in 2001 and reported 112,875 registered user accounts in April 2019.

== See also ==
- Codec listening test
