= Transparency (data compression) =

Perceptually indistinguishable data compression

In data compression and psychoacoustics, transparency is the result of lossy data compression advanced enough that the compressed result is perceptually indistinguishable from the uncompressed input, i.e., perceptually lossless.

A transparency threshold is a given value at which transparency is reached. It is commonly used to describe compressed data bitrates. For example, the transparency threshold for MP3 to linear PCM audio is said to be between 175 and 245 kbit/s, at 44.1 kHz, when encoded as VBR MP3 (corresponding to the -V3 and -V0 settings of the highly popular LAME MP3 encoder). This means that when an MP3 that was encoded at those bitrates is being played back, it is indistinguishable from the original PCM, and the compression is transparent to the listener.

The term transparent compression can also refer to a filesystem feature that allows compressed files to be read and written just like regular ones. In this case, the compressor is typically a general-purpose lossless compressor.

== Determination ==
Transparency, like sound or video quality, is subjective. It depends most on the listener's familiarity with digital artifacts, their awareness that artifacts may in fact be present, and to a lesser extent, the compression method, bit rate used, input characteristics, and the listening or viewing conditions and equipment. Despite this, sometimes a general consensus is formed for what compression options should provide transparent results for most people on most equipment. Due to the subjectivity and the changing nature of compression, recording, and playback technology, such opinions should be considered only as rough estimates rather than established fact.

Judging transparency can be difficult, due to observer bias, in which subjective like or dislike of a certain compression methodology emotionally influences their judgment. This bias is commonly referred to as placebo, although this usage is slightly different from the medical use of the term.

To scientifically prove that a compression method is not transparent, double-blind tests may be useful. The ABX method of hypothesis testing is normally used, with a null hypothesis that the samples tested are the same and with an alternative hypothesis that the samples are in fact different.

There is no way to prove whether a certain lossy compression methodology is transparent using hypothesis testing, since in hypothesis testing, a null hypothesis cannot be proven; it can either be rejected or fail to be rejected. Even when an ABX test or any other comparison fails, that does not prove that there is no difference; it can only be said that the difference could not be proven.

All lossless data compression methods are transparent, by nature.

=== In image compression ===
Both the DSC in DisplayPort and the default settings of JPEG XL are regarded as visually lossless. The losslessness is usually determined by a flicker test: the display initially shows the compressed and the original side-by-side, switches them around for a tiny fraction of a second and then goes back to the original. This test is more sensitive than a side-by-side comparison ("visually almost lossless"), as the human eye is highly sensitive to temporal changes in light. There is also a panning test that is purportedly more representative of sensitivity in the case of moving images than the flicker test.

== Difference from a lack of artifacts ==
A perceptually lossless compression is always free of compression artifacts, but the inverse is not true: it is possible for a compressor to produce a signal that appears natural but with altered contents. Such a confusion is widely present in the field of radiology (specifically for the study of diagnostically acceptable irreversible compression), where visually lossless is taken to mean anywhere from artifact-free to being indistinguishable on a side-to-side view, neither being as stringent as the flicker test.

== See also ==
- Codec listening test
- High fidelity § Listening tests
