= Super Video CD =

Video CD-based optical disc format

Super Video Compact Disc (SVCD)

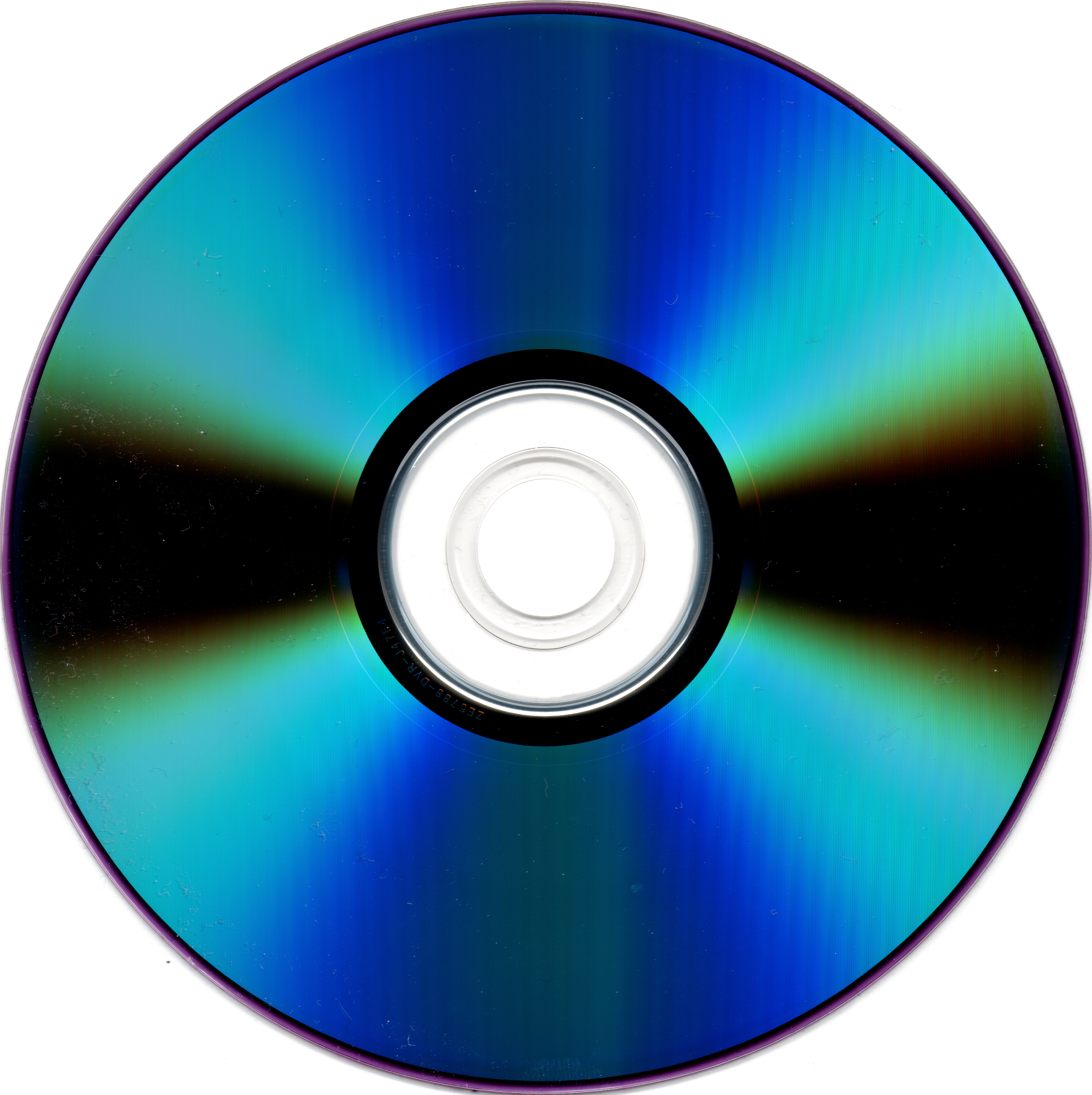
- Media type: Optical disc
- Encoding: MPEG-2 video + audio
- Capacity: Up to 800 MB
- Read mechanism: 780 nm wavelength semiconductor laser
- Standard: IEC 62107
- Developed by: Philips, Sony, Panasonic, JVC
- Usage: audio and video storage
- Extended from: Video CD
- Extended to: DVD
- Released: 1998

Super Video CD (Super Video Compact Disc, abbreviated as SVCD) is a digital format for storing video on standard compact discs. SVCD was intended as a successor to Video CD and an alternative to DVD-Video, and falls somewhere between both in terms of technical capability and picture quality.

== Technical specifications ==
=== Structure ===
Similar to VCDs, SVCDs comply with the CD-i Bridge format, and are authored (or "burned") using the CD-ROM XA format. The first track is in CD-ROM XA Mode 2, Form 1, and contains metadata about the disc. The other tracks are in Mode 2, Form 2, and contain audio and video multiplexed in a MPEG program stream (MPEG-PS) container. This allows roughly 800 megabytes of data to be stored on one 80 minute CD (versus 700 megabytes when using Mode 1). One CD can hold up to 35 minutes of full quality SVCD-format video and audio.

=== Video ===
The video encoding format was upgraded from MPEG-1 that VCD uses to MPEG-2, which is also used on DVD-Video, resulting in a higher picture quality at the same duration as VCD. However, the quality is lower than that of DVD-Video even though both SVCD and DVD-Video use MPEG-2, given that the bit rate has to be lowered to fit a movie of the same duration as a DVD, owing to the smaller storage capacity of CDs.

- Compression: MPEG-2
- Resolution: 2/3 D1
  - 480x480 (480i, analog NTSC compatible)
  - 480x576 (576i, analog PAL/SECAM compatible)
- Aspect ratio: 4:3
- Framerate:
  - 29.97 frames per second (analog NTSC compatible)
  - 25 frames per second (analog PAL/SECAM compatible)
- Bit rate: Up to 2.6 megabits per second
  - Rate control: constant or variable bit rate

Because of its 480x480 resolution and increased bit rate, SVCD picture quality is more than double that of VCD. On the downside, the increased bit rate sacrifices video length capacity by over 50%. Because of this, titles released on SVCD had to come on twice the number of discs.

Unlike other CD-based formats, such as China Video Disc and Video CD, Super Video CD video is incompatible with both the DVD-Video and Blu-ray standards due to a conflict in resolution. However, many DVD and Blu-ray players will play back SVCD resolution video from a DVD or Blu-ray disc anyway.

Interlaced video is supported for SVCD video. 23.976 frames per second video is supported by use of interlacing and 3:2 pulldown.

The combined audio and video bit rates should not exceed 2.7 Mbps. This data rate was chosen, in part, to ensure compatibility with slower and less expensive "2 × speed" CD drives.

=== Audio ===
- Compression: MPEG-1 Audio Layer II
- Frequency: 44,100 hertz (44.1 kHz)
- Output: Monaural, dual channel, stereo, and multichannel support up to 5.1 output
- Bit rate: from 32 to 384 kilobits per second, inclusive
  - Rate control: constant or variable bit rate

As with most compact disc-based video formats, SVCD audio is incompatible with the DVD-Video standard due to the difference in frequency; DVDs require 48 kHz, whereas SVCDs use 44.1 kHz.

SVCDs may have two separate stereo, or four mono audio tracks (for commentary or additional languages).

Audio may have up to 6 channels (in a 5.1 arrangement) using the MPEG Multichannel surround sound format, although space constraints and inconsistent hardware support make it impractical, and very uncommon.

Variable bit rate encoding, while not supported by the MPEG-1 Audio Layer II standard, is part of the SVCD specification. However, variable bit rate audio is not consistently supported by standalone players, and thus the format is rarely used.

=== Additional features ===
The SVCD standard supports several other features, including interactive menus, hyperlinks, karaoke lyric highlighting, four selectable overlay graphic subtitle streams, chapters, playlists, and DVD-quality still images/slide shows, along with audio, with a resolution of 704x480 (480i, analog NTSC compatible) or 704x576 (576i, analog PAL/SECAM compatible).

=== Playback issues ===
Play back of SVCD titles is impaired when played on most DVD players, causing dropped frames, choppy video playback or skipping of sound. This is due to the chosen two-thirds video ratio in the SVCD format specifications, which doesn't align well with the other more common video formats VCD and DVD. Most DVD players support the video formats VCD, SVCD and DVD (with horizontal resolutions of 352, 480 and 720 pixels respectively) but the best resolution usually dictates the design of all the electronics components, most notably the low pass filter. With only one analog low pass filter optimised for one video format (usually DVD 720), the other two video format will suffer from aliasing. The SVCD format is especially prone to "foldover" because the 480p format doesn't fit well over a 720p output. The aliasing artifacts that result from this bad fit are usually buried in noise from other sources, such as camera, quantization, and MPEG artifacts.

== Similar formats ==
=== CVD ===
China Video Disc (CVD) is a CD-based video format which was created during the development of the SVCD standard and is almost identical to SVCD. The primary technical difference is a lower (horizontal) video resolution of 352×480 (NTSC) or 352×576 (PAL/SECAM). Because 352×480/576 is a recognized DVD resolution, CVD video (but not audio) is fully compatible with the DVD-Video standard, and avoids the "foldover" (or aliasing) problems encountered when playing SVCDs on DVD players. The lower resolution also allows the bitrate to be reduced while keeping compression artifacts to a minimum. CVD also supports all of the additional features (selectable subtitles, multiple audio tracks, and so on) which are supported by SVCD.

=== XSVCD ===
XSVCD (eXtended Super VCD) is the name generally given to any format that stores MPEG-2 video on a compact disc in mode 2/XA, at SVCD resolution, but does not strictly meet the SVCD standard.

To reduce the data rate without significantly reducing quality, the size of the GOP can be increased, the maximum data rate can be exceeded, and a different MPEG-2 quantization matrix can be used. These changes can be advantageous for those who want to either maximize video quality, or use fewer discs.

=== RSVCD ===
RSVCD (RoBa SVCD) uses the Robshot-Bach (RoBa) method for encoding MPEG-2 video using CCE in creating SVCD-compliant discs. RSVCD was popularized on the Doom9 forum.

=== MVCD ===
MVCD (Mole VCD) is a XSVCD variant that can be created using the MVCD templates included with TMPGEnc. MVCD can encode either MPEG-1 or MPEG-2 video to VCD, SVCD, or DVD standard resolution. Many players accept MVCD encoded discs.

== History of development ==
Super Video CD was developed as part of a late 1990s Chinese government-sponsored effort to create a next-generation CD-based video standard. The primary motivating factor was the need for an alternative to the DVD format that would not be restricted by technology royalties. The Chinese government was concerned that the DVD format was too tightly controlled by foreign companies, and that a significant opportunity existed for the development of a domestic format that could deliver comparable quality without the restrictions of DVD. It was also hoped that SVCD's development would help to drive down the cost of consumer DVD players and DVD licensing fees in China. Three independent efforts attempted to solve these problems: CVD, SVCD, and HQ-VCD.

China Video Disc (CVD), developed by C-Cube Microsystems (a major producer of chips for Video CD players), was the earliest entry, having completed its specification in 1997, before the other two had even reached a draft stage. Super Video CD (SVCD) was second, being developed by the government-backed China Recording Standards Committee, under direction from the Chinese Ministry of Information Industry, with technical support from ESS Technology. High-Quality Video CD (HQ-VCD), developed by the Video CD Consortium (consisting of Philips, Sony, Matsushita and JVC — creators of the original Video CD specification) was a relatively late entry.

The Chinese Ministry of Information and the Video CD Consortium agreed to join forces, incorporating the features of HQ-VCD under a unified SVCD format. But by the time the SVCD specification was ready in July 1998, CVD had already been adopted by major manufacturers and had quickly established a significant installed base of about 600,000 players. This prompted the Chinese government to force a compromise between the competing standards in order to maintain compatibility.

The SVCD and CVD standards were combined into one composite standard known as Chaoji Video CD ("Chaoji" in Pinyin or 超级 in written Chinese, meaning "super") in November 1998, which was adopted by the Chinese government as the "official" next-generation video disc standard. Chaoji VCD is effectively synonymous with Super VCD. A Super VCD player must be able to play a variety of formats, including SVCD, CVD, VCD 2.0, VCD 1.1 and CD audio discs.

On July 15, 2000, the IEC certified SVCD an international standard CD format, as IEC 62107.

Philips added an SVCD logo to its canon of official Compact Disc logos. SVCD titles were available commercially in China, Hong Kong, and several other Asian countries (except the Philippines). In the Western world, the format is more commonly used to store home videos or movies copied from DVD and Laserdisc.

== See also ==
- DVD
- Video CD
- DVD Video
- cDVD - (AKA Mini-DVD), DVD video on a CD
- Enhanced Versatile Disc
- Super Audio CD
- Comparison of video player software
