= TooLAME =

MPEG-1 Layer II (MP2) audio encoder

- Developer(s): Mike Cheng
- Stable release: 0.2L / March 1, 2003; 22 years ago
- Preview release: 0.2 m beta 8
- Type: Codec
- License: GNU Lesser General Public License
- Website: toolame.sourceforge.net

TooLAME is a free software MPEG-1 Layer II (MP2) audio encoder written primarily by Mike Cheng. While there are many MP2 encoders, TooLAME is well-known and widely used for its particularly high audio quality. It has been unmaintained since 2003, but is directly succeeded by the TwoLAME code fork (the latest version, TwoLAME 0.4.0, was released October 11, 2019). The name TooLAME is a play on LAME and Layer II.

== History ==
After leaving leadership of the LAME project, Mike Cheng decided to redirect his efforts towards the MP2 format. This was in part due to concern with looming legal threats to those distributing software for the widespread MP3 format, due to patents held by Fraunhofer and Thomson, while use of MP2 audio appeared to be unrestricted. For more, see: LAME#Patents and legal issues.

The first release of TooLAME (v0.1) was November 7, 1998.

He originally based his work on mpegaudio.tar. In October 1999, he started over from scratch, instead basing TooLAME on the more capable ISO Dist10 reference implementation, and substantial code from LAME. He aimed for higher audio quality and improved encoding performance. Achieving high performance, "About 4 times faster than ISO code."

TooLAME was mainly a standalone audio encoder, accepting PCM files in RAW/AIFF/WAV format. However, in the final TooLAME release from Cheng (TooLAME 0.2 m beta 8), support for use as a library was included. Cheng repeatedly resisted the addition of features like libsndfile integration for support of a much wider variety of input formats.

=== TwoLAME ===
Nicholas Humfrey made significant modifications to tooLAME, and released it publicly. At Mike Cheng's request he renamed it to TwoLAME to avoid confusion.

== Technical details ==
TooLAME utilizes the highly tuned psychoacoustic model developed for LAME, but applied to MP2 audio encoding, instead. It includes a rather complex and rarely used (by MP2 players) variable bitrate (VBR) mode. Frame CRCs, and Broadcast Wave Format (BWF) output was added for Digital Audio Broadcasting (DAB) use.

== Popularity ==
MJPEGTools documentation recommends the use of TooLAME instead of their included mp2enc. MPlayer and Mencoder includes support for TooLAME (and TwoLAME) audio encoding.

== Code forks ==
- TwoLAME: Mainly code clean-up, API change, performance improvements
- MCTooLAME: TooLAME fork with MPEG Multichannel 5.1-channel surround sound encoding.
- TooLameF: Floating-point implementation TooLAME as a Windows DLL.
- Toolame-DAB: A deprecated modification TooLAME that creates DAB-complaint output, it was once part of the ODR-mmbTools toolchain.

== See also ==
- MPEG-1 Layer II
- MP3
- LAME
- MPEG-1
- Digital Audio Broadcasting
