= LAME =

MPEG-1 Audio Layer 3 (MP3) audio encoder

- LAME official logo

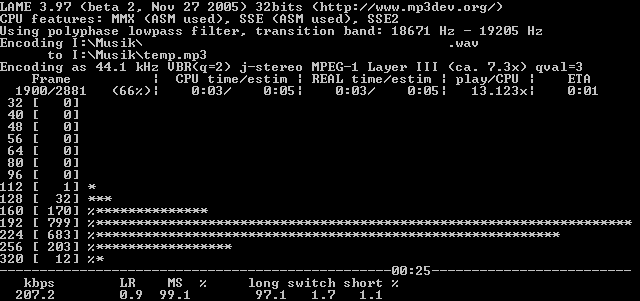
- LAME v3.97 encoding a VBR file
- Developer: LAME Developers
- Release: 1998; 28 years ago
- Stable release: 3.100 / 13 October 2017; 8 years ago
- Operating system: Cross-platform
- Type: Codec
- License: GNU Lesser General Public License
- Website: lame.sourceforge.io
- Repository: sf.net/p/lame/svn/

LAME is a software encoder that converts digital audio into the MP3 audio coding format. LAME is a free software project that was first released in 1998 and has incorporated many improvements since then, including an improved psychoacoustic model.

LAME was required by some programs released as free software, in which LAME was linked for MP3 support. This avoided including LAME itself, which used patented techniques and so required patent licenses in some countries. All relevant patents have since expired, and LAME is now bundled with Audacity.

== History ==
=== Earliest versions ===
Around mid-1998, Mike Cheng created LAME 1.0 as a set of modifications against the 8 Hz-MP3 encoder source code, and named the resulting encoder LAME, as a recursive acronym for "LAME Ain't an MP3 Encoder", as initial releases of the software lacked the ability to produce encoded MP3 streams without third-party code. (Later releases allowed LAME to function as a standalone MP3 encoder.)

After some quality concerns were raised by others, he decided to start again from scratch based on the dist10 MPEG reference software sources. His goal was only to speed up the dist10 sources, and leave its quality untouched. That branch (a patch against the reference sources) became Lame 2.0 in October 1998. The project started to attract other contributors. Mike Cheng eventually left leadership and started working on tooLAME (an MP2 encoder).

=== Later versions ===
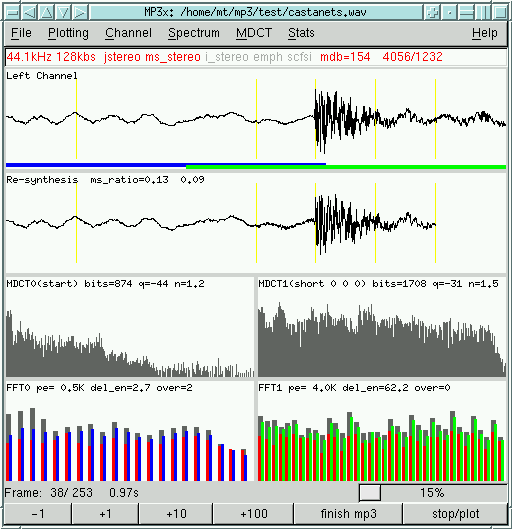
MP3x analysing MP3 encoding done through LAME

This initial focus on quality by Mark Taylor quickly gathered interest from other people, who also started to bring quality and speed improvements. Within the most notable contributors are (in alphabetical order): Gabriel Bouvigne, Mike Cheng, Robert Hegemann, Frank Klemm, Alexander Leidinger, Naoki Shibata, Mark Taylor, Takehiro Tominaga.

Over time, LAME evolved on the SourceForge website until it became the de facto CBR MP3 encoder. Work progressed on true variable bit rate using a quality goal between 0 and 10. Eventually, numbers (such as -V 9.600) could generate excellent quality low bit rate voice encoding at only 41 kbit/s using the MPEG-2.5 extensions.

== Audio quality ==
Audio quality is usually assessed through double blind listening tests, over a group of participants testing multiple samples. Lame has been tested in several such tests.

At around 128k bit/s, it proved to be quite competitive, outperforming several other encoders:

- In July 2003, at around 128k bit/s (ABR), LAME 3.90.3 has been demonstrated to outperform the Blade MP3 encoder (which produces identical results to the dist10 reference software), but has been demonstrated to be of lower quality than the AAC encoder from QuickTime, Musepack, Ogg Vorbis and the WMA9 Pro encoders.
- In January 2004, at around 128k bit/s (ABR), LAME 3.95 has been demonstrated to be tied to the Audioactive MP3 encoder, and better than the MP3 encoder from Xing, FHG, GoGo and iTunes. The test organizer latter added a clarification about the fact that the Xing and FhG encoders might have produced better results using different parameters.
- In May 2004, at around 128k bit/s (VBR), LAME 3.96 has been demonstrated to outperform the WMA9 and Atrac3 encoders, to be tied to the iTunes AAC encoder, and to be surpassed by the Vorbis aoTuV and MPC encoders.
- In December 2005, at around 128k bit/s (VBR), LAME 3.97b2 has been demonstrated to be tied to the Nero and iTunes AAC-LC, Vorbis and WMA9 Pro encoders. All the tested encoders significantly outperformed the Shine MP3 encoder.

At low bitrates, LAME is of significantly lower quality than encoders using other formats:

- In June 2004, at 32k bit/s (CBR), LAME 3.96 has been outperformed by Vorbis, WMA9, Nero HE-AACv2, mp3PRO, RealAudio and QDesign encoders (all of them using other formats than MP3).

=== Voice coding ===
For the general field of human speech reproduction, a bandwidth of 5,512 Hz is sufficient to produce excellent results (for voice) using the sampling rate of 11,025 and VBR encoding from 44,100 (standard) WAV file. English speakers average 41–42 kbit/s with -V 9.6 setting but this may vary with the amount of silence recorded or the rate of delivery (wpm). Resampling to 12,000 (6K bandwidth) is selected by the LAME parameter -V 9.4. Likewise -V 9.2 selects a 16,000 sample rate and a resultant 8K lowpass filtering. Older versions of LAME and FFmpeg only support integer arguments for the variable bit rate quality selection parameter. The n.nnn quality parameter (-V) is documented at lame.sourceforge.net but is only supported in LAME with the new style VBR variable bit rate quality selector—not average bit rate (ABR).

== Patents and legal issues ==
Like all MP3 encoders, LAME implemented techniques covered by patents owned by the Fraunhofer Society and others. The developers of LAME did not license the technology described by these patents. Distributing compiled binaries of LAME, its libraries, or programs that derive from LAME in countries where those patents have been granted may have constituted infringement, but since 23 April 2017, all of these patents have expired.

The LAME developers stated that, since their code was only released in source code form, it should only be considered as an educational description of an MP3 encoder, and thus did not infringe any patent in itself. They also advised users to obtain relevant patent licenses before including a compiled version of the encoder in a product. Some software was released using this strategy: companies used the LAME library, but obtained patent licenses.

== See also ==
- List of codecs
- Lossy compression
