= MPEG-1 Audio Layer II =

Lossy audio compression format

- Filename extension: .mp2, .mpa, .m2a, .mp2a
- Internet media type: audio/mpeg, audio/MPA
- Developed by: Philips and others
- Initial release: 6 December 1991; 34 years ago
- Latest release: ISO/IEC 13818-3:1998; April 1998; 28 years ago
- Type of format: Lossy audio
- Contained by: MPEG-ES
- Standard: ISO/IEC 11172-3, ISO/IEC 13818-3
- Open format?: Yes
- Free format?: Expired patents
- Website: mpeg.chiariglione.org/standards/mpeg-1/audio.html

MP2 (formally MPEG-1 Audio Layer II or MPEG-2 Audio Layer II, sometimes incorrectly called Musicam) is a lossy audio compression format. It is standardised as one of the three audio codecs of MPEG-1 alongside MPEG-1 Audio Layer I (MP1) and MPEG-1 Audio Layer III (MP3). The MP2 abbreviation is also used as a common file extension for files containing this type of audio data, or its extended variant MPEG-2 Audio Layer II.

MPEG-1 Audio Layer II was developed by Philips, CCETT and IRT as the MUSICAM algorithm, as part of the European-funded Digital Audio Broadcasting (DAB) project. Alongside its use on DAB broadcasts, the codec has been adopted as the standard audio format for Video CD and Super Video CD media, and also for HDV. On the other hand, MP3 (which was developed by a rival collaboration led by Fraunhofer Society called ASPEC) gained more widespread acceptance for PC and Internet applications. MP2 has a lower data compression ratio than MP3, but is also less computationally intensive.

== Technical specifications ==
MPEG-1 Audio Layer II is defined in ISO/IEC 11172-3 (MPEG-1 Part 3)

- Sampling rates: 32, 44.1 and 48 kHz
- Bit rates: 32, 48, 56, 64, 80, 96, 112, 128, 160, 192, 224, 256, 320 and 384 kbit/s

An extension has been provided in MPEG-2 Audio Layer II and is defined in ISO/IEC 13818-3 (MPEG-2 Part 3)

- Additional sampling rates: 16, 22.05 and 24 kHz
- Additional bit rates: 8, 16, 24, 40 and 144 kbit/s
- Multichannel support – up to 5 full range audio channels and an LFE-channel (Low Frequency Enhancement channel)

The format is based on successive digital frames of 1152 sampling intervals with four possible formats:

- Mono format
- Stereo format
- Intensity encoded joint stereo format (stereo irrelevance)
- Dual channel (uncorrelated) format

=== Variable bit rate ===
MPEG audio may have variable bit rate (VBR), but it is not widely supported. Layer II can use a method called bit rate switching. Each frame may be created with a different bit rate. According to ISO/IEC 11172-3:1993, Section 2.4.2.3: To provide the smallest possible delay and complexity, the (MPEG audio) decoder is not required to support a continuously variable bit rate when in layer I or II.

=== MPEG-2 Audio Layer II ===
While the term MP2 and filename extension .mp2 usually refer MPEG-1 Audio Layer II data, it can also refer to MPEG-2 Audio Layer II, a mostly backward compatible extension which adds support for multichannel audio, variable bit rate encoding, and additional sampling rates, defined in ISO/IEC 13818-3 as part of MPEG-2 standards.

== Technique ==
MP2 is a sub-band audio encoder, which means that compression takes place in the time domain with a low-delay filter bank producing 32 frequency domain components. By comparison, MP3 is a transform audio encoder with hybrid filter bank, which means that compression takes place in the frequency domain after a hybrid (double) transformation from the time domain. MPEG Audio Layer II is the core algorithm of the MP3 standards. All psychoacoustical characteristics and frame format structures of the MP3 format are derived from the basic MP2 algorithm and format.

The MP2 encoder may exploit inter channel redundancies using optional "joint stereo" intensity encoding. Like MP3, MP2 is a perceptual coding format, which means that it removes information that the human auditory system will not be able to easily perceive. To choose which information to remove, the audio signal is analyzed according to a psychoacoustic model, which takes into account the parameters of the human auditory system. Research into psychoacoustics has shown that if there is a strong signal on a certain frequency, then weaker signals at frequencies close to the strong signal's frequency cannot be perceived by the human auditory system. This is called frequency masking. Perceptual audio codecs take advantage of this frequency masking by ignoring information at frequencies that are deemed to be imperceptible, thus allowing more data to be allocated to the reproduction of perceptible frequencies.

MP2 splits the input audio signal into 32 sub-bands, and if the audio in a sub-band is deemed to be imperceptible then that sub-band is not transmitted. MP3, on the other hand, transforms the input audio signal to the frequency domain in 576 frequency components. Therefore, MP3 has a higher frequency resolution than MP2, which allows the psychoacoustic model to be applied more selectively than for MP2. So MP3 has greater scope to reduce the bit rate.

The use of an additional entropy coding tool, and higher frequency accuracy (due to the larger number of frequency sub-bands used by MP3) explains why MP3 does not need as high a bit rate as MP2 to get an acceptable audio quality. Conversely, MP2 shows a better behavior than MP3 in the time domain, due to its lower frequency resolution. This implies less codec time delay—which can make editing audio simpler—as well as "ruggedness" and resistance to errors which may occur during the digital recording process, or during transmission errors.

The MP2 sub-band filter bank also provides an inherent "transient concealment" feature, due to the specific temporal masking effect of its mother filter. This unique characteristic of the MPEG-1 Audio family implies a very good sound quality on audio signals with rapid energy changes, such as percussive sounds. Because both the MP2 and MP3 formats use the same basic sub-band filter bank, both benefit from this characteristic.

== Applications of MP2 ==
=== Live broadcasts ===
MPEG-1 Audio Layer II is the audio format used in Digital Audio Broadcast (DAB), a standard for broadcasting digital audio radio services that has been adopted in many regions around the world. The BBC Research & Development department states that at least 192 kbit/s is necessary for a high fidelity stereo broadcast:

A value of 256 kbit/s has been judged to provide a high quality stereo broadcast signal. However, a small reduction, to 224 kbit/s is often adequate, and in some cases it may be possible to accept a further reduction to 192 kbit/s, especially if redundancy in the stereo signal is exploited by a process of 'joint stereo' encoding (i.e. some sounds appearing at the centre of the stereo image need not be sent twice). At 192 kbit/s, it is relatively easy to hear imperfections in critical audio material.

— BBC R&D White Paper WHP 061 June 2003

As of 2025, MPEG-1 Audio Layer II remains in widespread use in the United Kingdom for DAB broadcasts; the newer DAB+ standard which is now predominant elsewhere in Europe and in other regions does not use MP2 but HE-AAC instead. MP2 was also adopted as the audio format used by Astra Digital Radio (ADR) broadcasts and by the Multimedia Home Platform (DVB-MHP) standard for set-top boxes. MP2 is also used alongside Dolby Digital (AC3) in the audio streams for some DVB broadcasts.

MPEG-1 Audio Layer II is commonly used within the broadcast industry for distributing live audio over satellite, ISDN and IP Network connections as well as for storage of audio in digital playout systems. An example is NPR's PRSS Content Depot programming distribution system. The Content Depot distributes MPEG-1 L2 audio in a Broadcast Wave File wrapper. MPEG2 with RIFF headers (used in .wav) is specified in the RIFF/WAV standards. As a result, Windows Media Player will directly play Content Depot files, however, less intelligent .wav players often do not. As the encoding and decoding process would have been a significant drain on CPU resources in the first generations of broadcast playout systems, professional broadcast playout systems typically implement the codec in hardware, such as by delegating the task of encoding and decoding to a compatible soundcard rather than the system CPU.

=== Distributed and recordable media ===
MPEG-1 Audio Layer II is the standard audio format used in the Video CD and Super Video CD formats (VCD and SVCD also support variable bit rate and MPEG Multichannel as added by MPEG-2). All DVD-Video players in PAL countries contain stereo MP2 decoders, making MP2 a possible competitor to Dolby Digital (AC3) in these markets. DVD-Video players in NTSC countries are not required to decode MP2 audio, although most do. While some DVD recorders store audio in MP2 and many consumer-authored DVDs use the format, commercial DVDs with MP2 soundtracks are rare.

MPEG-1 Audio Layer II is also the audio format used in HDV camcorders.

== Encoders and decoders ==
MPEG-1 Audio Layer II (MP2) encoder software include TooLAME, MP2ENC (Wav2mp), QDesign Imedia 2, and others. CDex and Exact Audio Copy are some of the CD ripping software that can encode to MP2. Many modern media player software can play MP2 files including Winamp, VLC, Windows Media Player, MusicBee and iTunes.

MP2 files are compatible with some, but not all, digital audio players ("MP3 players").

== History of development ==
=== MUSICAM ===
MPEG-1 Audio Layer 2 encoding was derived from the MUSICAM (Masking pattern adapted Universal Subband Integrated Coding And Multiplexing) audio codec, developed by Centre commun d'études de télévision et télécommunications (CCETT), Philips, and the Institut für Rundfunktechnik (IRT) in 1989 as part of the EUREKA 147 pan-European inter-governmental research and development initiative for the development of a system for the broadcasting of audio and data to fixed, portable or mobile receivers (established in 1987).

It began as the Digital Audio Broadcast (DAB) project managed by Egon Meier-Engelen of the Deutsche Forschungs- und Versuchsanstalt für Luft- und Raumfahrt (later on called Deutsches Zentrum für Luft- und Raumfahrt, German Aerospace Center) in Germany. The European Community financed this project, commonly known as EU-147, from 1987 to 1994 as a part of the EUREKA research program.

The Eureka 147 System comprised three main elements: MUSICAM Audio Coding (Masking pattern Universal Sub-band Integrated Coding And Multiplexing), Transmission Coding & Multiplexing and COFDM Modulation.

MUSICAM was one of the few codecs able to achieve high audio quality at bit rates in the range of 64 to 192 kbit/s per monophonic channel. It has been designed to meet the technical requirements of most applications (in the field of broadcasting, telecommunication and recording on digital storage media) — low delay, low complexity, error robustness, short access units, etc.

As a predecessor of the MP3 format and technology, the perceptual codec MUSICAM is based on integer arithmetics 32 subbands transform, driven by a psychoacoustic model. It was primarily designed for Digital Audio Broadcasting and digital TV, and disclosed by CCETT(France) and IRT (Germany) in Atlanta during an IEEE-ICASSP conference. This codec incorporated into a broadcasting system using COFDM modulation was demonstrated on air and on the field together with Radio Canada and CRC Canada during the NAB show (Las Vegas) in 1991. The implementation of the audio part of this broadcasting system was based on a two chips encoder (one for the subband transform, one for the psychoacoustic model designed by the team of G. Stoll (IRT Germany), later known as Psychoacoustic model I in the ISO MPEG audio standard) and a real time decoder using one Motorola 56001 DSP chip running an integer arithmetics software designed by Y.F. Dehery's team (CCETT, France). The simplicity of the corresponding decoder together with the high audio quality of this codec using for the first time a 48 kHz sampling frequency, a 20 bits/sample input format (the highest available sampling standard in 1991, compatible with the AES/EBU professional digital input studio standard) were the main reasons to later adopt the characteristics of MUSICAM as the basic features for an advanced digital music compression codec such as MP3.

The audio coding algorithm used by the Eureka 147 Digital Audio Broadcasting (DAB) system has been subject to the standardization process within the ISO/Moving Pictures Expert Group (MPEG) in 1989–94. MUSICAM audio coding was used as a basis for some coding schemes of MPEG-1 and MPEG-2 Audio. Most key features of MPEG-1 Audio were directly inherited from MUSICAM, including the filter bank, time-domain processing, audio frame sizes, etc. However, improvements were made, and the actual MUSICAM algorithm was not used in the final MPEG-1 Audio Layer II standard.

Since the finalisation of MPEG-1 Audio and MPEG-2 Audio (in 1992 and 1994), the original MUSICAM algorithm is not used anymore. The name MUSICAM is often mistakenly used when MPEG-1 Audio Layer II is meant. This can lead to some confusion, because the name MUSICAM is trademarked by different companies in different regions of the world. (Musicam is the name used for MP2 in some specifications for Astra Digital Radio as well as in the BBC's DAB documents.)

The Eureka Project 147 resulted in the publication of European Standard, ETS 300 401 in 1995, for DAB which now has worldwide acceptance. The DAB standard uses the MPEG-1 Audio Layer II (ISO/IEC 11172-3) for 48 kHz sampling frequency and the MPEG-2 Audio Layer II (ISO/IEC 13818-3) for 24 kHz sampling frequency.

=== MPEG Audio ===
In the late 1980s, ISO's Moving Picture Experts Group (MPEG) started an effort to standardize digital audio and video encoding, expected to have a wide range of applications in digital radio and TV broadcasting (later DAB, DMB, DVB), and use on CD-ROM (later Video CD). The MUSICAM audio coding was one of 14 proposals for MPEG-1 Audio standard that were submitted to ISO in 1989.

The MPEG-1 Audio standard was based on the existing MUSICAM and ASPEC audio formats. The MPEG-1 Audio standard included the three audio "layers" (encoding techniques) now known as Layer I (MP1), Layer II (MP2) and Layer III (MP3). All algorithms for MPEG-1 Audio Layer I, II and III were approved in 1991 as the committee draft of ISO-11172 and finalized in 1992 as part of MPEG-1, the first standard suite by MPEG, which resulted in the international standard ISO/IEC 11172-3 (a.k.a. MPEG-1 Audio or MPEG-1 Part 3), published in 1993. Further work on MPEG audio was finalized in 1994 as part of the second suite of MPEG standards, MPEG-2, more formally known as international standard ISO/IEC 13818-3 (a.k.a. MPEG-2 Part 3 or backward compatible MPEG-2 Audio or MPEG-2 Audio BC), originally published in 1995. MPEG-2 Part 3 (ISO/IEC 13818-3) defined additional bit rates and sample rates for MPEG-1 Audio Layer I, II and III. The new sampling rates are exactly half that of those originally defined for MPEG-1 Audio. MPEG-2 Part 3 also enhanced MPEG-1's audio by allowing the coding of audio programs with more than two channels, up to 5.1 multichannel.

The Layer III (MP3) component uses a lossy compression algorithm that was designed to greatly reduce the amount of data required to represent an audio recording and sound like a decent reproduction of the original uncompressed audio for most listeners.

=== Emmy Award in Engineering ===
CCETT (France), IRT (Germany) and Philips (The Netherlands) won an Emmy Award in Engineering 2000 for development of a digital audio two-channel compression system known as Musicam or MPEG Audio Layer II.

== See also ==
- Elementary stream
- MP4 (container format)
- Musepack originally MP2-based, with numerous improvements
