= Caribbean Centre of Excellence for Teacher Training =

Teacher training facility in the Caribbean

The Caribbean Centre of Excellence for Teacher Training (Caribbean CETT) is an organization which seeks to enhance the quality of teacher training in the Caribbean. It came into existence as part of a USAID-funded Presidential Initiative established at the 2001 Summit of the Americas, held in Montreal, Quebec, Canada. The Caribbean CETT is a significant part of a hemispheric thrust by the USAID to improve student literacy in the first three grades of primary schools in the Western Hemisphere (Latin America & the Caribbean.) In the three regions of the Western hemisphere, the USAID created Centres of Excellence in Kingston, Jamaica, for the Caribbean, the CETT Andino, for South America in Lima, Peru, and the CETT for Central America & Dominican Republic located in Tegucigalpa, Honduras.

In the Caribbean, the initiative is seen as a long-term effort through the use of education to improve the region’s economic prospects. Throughout the region persistent poverty and stagnant economies have combined to hinder full participation in the global marketplace. An educated population offers the answer to promoting social and economic development, jobs, and personal well-being. The ability to read and write well is the foundation for all future learning. An alarming number of children in the Caribbean lack the proper literacy skills needed for success in life. As they progress through the educational system, many of these children find it more difficult to grasp material, get frustrated and drop out of school. Their premature exit from the educational system limits future economic prospects and throughout the Caribbean has contributed to the cycle of poverty.

It sponsored a study tour to Belize for teacher educators from Trinidad and Tobago in 2009. The Caribbean CETT has also made donations of library materials to the University of Guyana.

== Mandate ==
The Caribbean CETT programme is implemented through the Joint Board of Teacher Education (JTBE) which is a part of the University of the West Indies (UWI) Mona, Jamaica. At its official launch on April 9, 2003, the Caribbean CETT was given the following mandates:

- Provide innovative leadership in motivating, empowering and equipping teachers at grades 1-3 of primary schools to better teach reading and writing.
- Train teachers at the primary level in the use of best practices in reading instructions
- Design, develop, implement and evaluate creative methods of improving reading in project schools.
- Develop relevant diagnostic tools to provide teachers with data for use in creating ‘relevant’ programmes which will meet the needs of their students.
- Produce and appropriate culturally sensitive teaching and learning material to project schools throughout the Caribbean.
- Utilize improvements in information and communication technology to enhance and support all aspects of the programme.
- Certify all graduates of the teacher education programme, so proving that they are competent teachers of reading and writing.
- Ensure that synergy is maintained with the schools so that teachers of reading can keep pace with the latest developments and best practices of reading instructions.

Caribbean CETT also has an office in Belize.
