= Centre commun d'études de télévision et télécommunications =

French telecommunications research center

CCETT or Centre commun d'études de télévision et télécommunications (Centre for the Study of Television broadcasting and Telecommunication or Common Study Center of Telediffusion and Telecommunication) was a research centre created in Rennes (France) in 1972 jointly by the Office de Radiodiffusion Télévision Française (ORTF) (later Télédiffusion de France) and Centre National d'Etudes des Telecommunications (CNET) (Direction Générale des Télécommunications, part of the French Ministry of Posts and Telecommunications) for development of new techniques for processing, transmission and distribution of audiovisual signals.

CCETT became part of France Télécom R&D, the research and development division of France Télécom in 1998. This division was derived from different ancient entities, such as CNET (the research and development centre of France Telecom, created in 1944), the CCETT, as well as other entities. Since 2007, France Telecom R&D is also known as Orange Labs, a global network of R&D entities.

CCETT/France Télécom R&D contributed to various international standards, such as ISO/IEC MPEG and JPEG standards or DAB and DVB standards. CCETT, IRT and Philips developed a digital audio two-channel compression system known as Musicam or MPEG Audio Layer II (Emmy Award in Engineering 2000).

== See also ==
- Antiope (teletext)
