= Video CD =

CD-based format meant for digital video distribution

Compact Disc Digital Video (VCD)

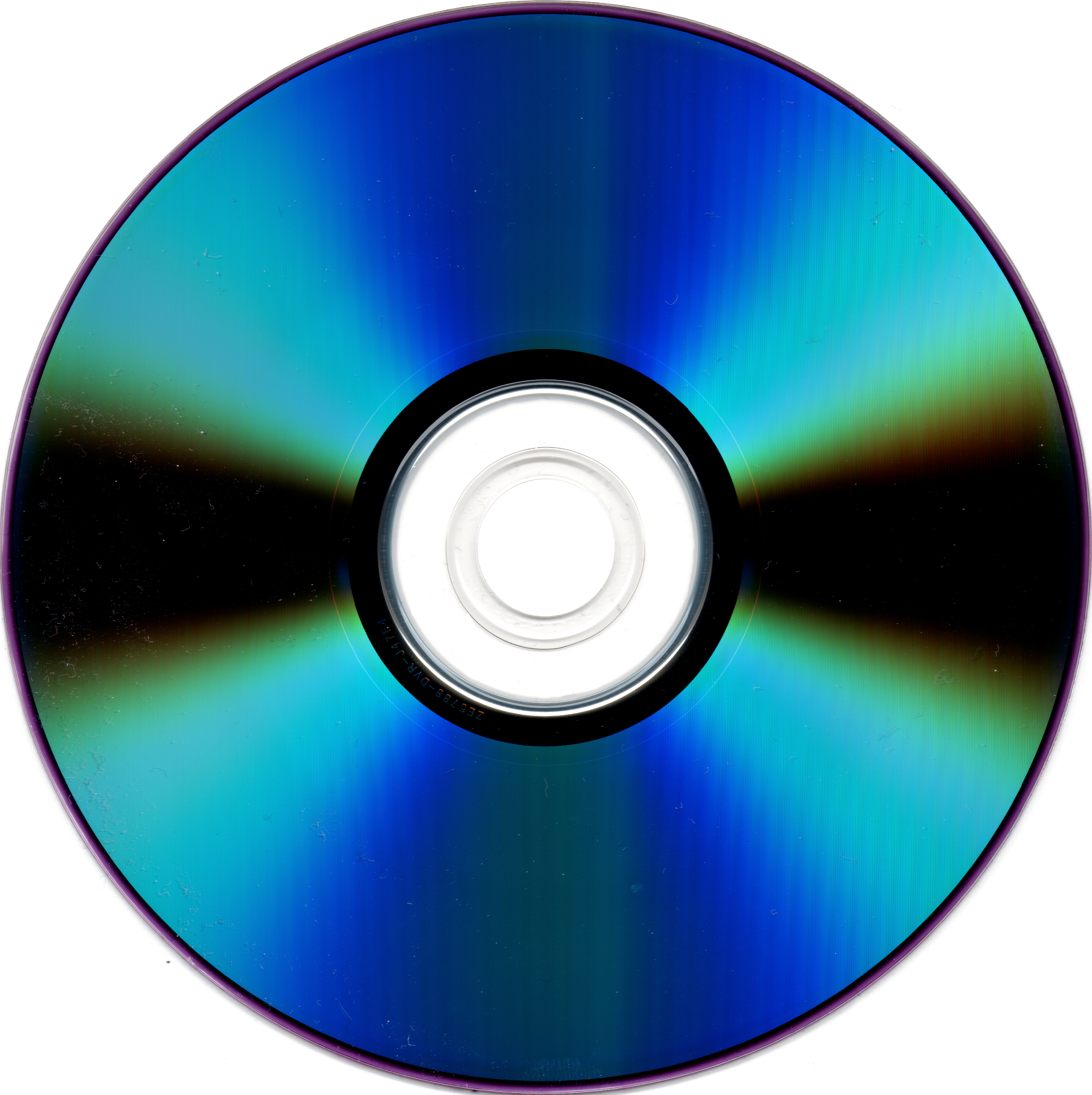
- Media type: Optical disc
- Encoding: MPEG-1 video + audio
- Capacity: Up to 800 MB/80 minutes of video
- Read mechanism: 780 nm wavelength (red) semiconductor laser
- Standard: IEC 62107
- Developed by: Philips, Sony, Panasonic, JVC
- Usage: audio and video storage
- Extended from: CD Video / Video Single Disc
- Extended to: SVCD
- Released: 1993

Video CD (abbreviated as VCD, also known as Compact Disc Digital Video, abbreviated as CDDV) is a home video format and the first format for distributing films on standard 120 mm (4.7 in) optical discs. The format was widely adopted in nearly all of Asia (except for Japan and South Korea), superseding the VHS and Betamax systems in those regions until DVD-Video became more affordable in the 2000s.

The format is a standard digital data format for storing video on a compact disc. VCD discs/disc images are playable in dedicated VCD players and widely playable in most DVD players, personal computers and some video game consoles with an optical disc drive that is programmed to understand VCD discs.

The Video CD standard was created in 1993 by Sony, Philips, Matsushita and JVC; it is referred to as the White Book standard. The MPEG-1 video compression format was also released that same year.

== History ==
=== Predecessors ===
LaserDisc was first available on the market, in Atlanta, Georgia, on December 15, 1978. This 30 cm (12 in) disc could hold an hour of analog audio and video (digital audio was added a few years later) on each side. The LaserDisc provided picture quality nearly double the resolution of VHS tape and analog audio quality far superior to cheap mono VHS recorders (although the difference to the more expensive VHS HiFi stereo recorders was minuscule).

Philips later teamed up with Sony to develop a new type of disc, called the compact disc or CD. Introduced in 1982 in Japan (1983 in the U.S. and Europe), the CD is about 120 mm (4.7 in) in diameter, and is single-sided. The format was initially designed to store digitized sound and proved to be a success in the music industry.

In 1987, Philips released CD Video (CD-V), (Note: Despite the similar name, CD Video differed fundamentally from- and was completely incompatible with- the later, all-digital Video CD format.) effectively a hybrid format combining analog LaserDisc-compatible video (Note: Unlike some earlier LaserDisc releases, "CD Video"-branded releases included a digital soundtrack. However, the video itself remained analog.) alongside separate audio-only CD-compatible tracks on a 12cm CD-sized disc. (Note: The "CD Video" brand was also used to market some 20cm and 30cm LaserDiscs that featured digital soundtracks but no actual CD-compatible audio.)

However, the disc's small size meant it could only hold six minutes of analog video, restricting it primarily to song-length music videos. CD Video had been discontinued by the early 1990s as Philips concentrated on more promising MPEG-based digital video compression.

== Development ==
By the early 1990s engineers were able to digitize and compress video signals, greatly improving storage efficiency. Because this new format could hold 74/80 minutes of audio and video on a 650/700MB disc, releasing movies on compact discs finally became a reality. Extra capacity was obtained by sacrificing the error correction, as it was believed that minor errors in the datastream would go unnoticed by the viewer. This format was named Video CD or VCD. Despite the similar name it differed fundamentally from—and was incompatible with—the earlier CD Video format.

"Copy Protected" logo on a VCD package produced in Hong Kong

VCD enjoyed a brief period of success, with a few major feature films being released in the format (usually as a 2 disc set). However the introduction of the CD-R disc and associated recorders stopped the release of feature films in their tracks because the VCD format had no means of preventing unauthorized (and perfect) copies from being made. Despite this, as of 2013, VCDs were still being produced and released in several countries in Asia with additional copy-protection.

The development of more sophisticated, higher capacity optical disc formats yielded the DVD format, released only a few years later with a copy protection mechanism. DVD players use lasers that are of shorter wavelength than those used on CDs, allowing the recorded pits to be smaller, so that more information can be stored. The DVD was so successful that it eventually pushed VHS out of the video market once suitable recorders became widely available. Nevertheless, VCDs made considerable inroads into developing nations such as in Asia where low-cost VCD players as well as pirated copies of films were widespread.

== Technical specifications ==
=== Structure ===
Video CDs comply with the CD-i Bridge format, and are authored using tracks in CD-ROM XA mode. The first track of a VCD is in CD-ROM XA Mode 2 Form 1, and stores metadata and menu information inside an ISO 9660 filesystem. This track may also contain other non-essential files, and is shown by operating systems when loading the disc. This track can be absent from a VCD, which would still work but would not allow it to be properly displayed in computers.

The rest of the tracks are usually in CD-ROM XA Mode 2 Form 2 and contain video and audio multiplexed in an MPEG program stream (MPEG-PS) container, but CD audio tracks are also allowed. Using Mode 2 Form 2 allows roughly 800 megabytes of VCD data to be stored on one 80 minute CD (versus 700 megabytes when using CD-ROM Mode 1). This is achieved by sacrificing the error correction redundancy present in Mode 1. It was considered that small errors in the video and audio stream pass largely unnoticed. This, combined with the net bitrate of VCD video and audio, means that almost exactly 80 minutes of VCD content can be stored on an 80-minute CD, 74 minutes of VCD content on a 74-minute CD, and so on. This was done in part to ensure compatibility with existing CD drive technology, specifically the earliest "1x" speed CD drives.

=== Video ===
VCD resolution compared to other formats

Video specifications

- Compression: MPEG-1
- Aspect Ratio: 4:3
- Resolution:
  - analog NTSC compatible: 352×240 (240p)
  - analog PAL/SECAM compatible: 352×288 (288p)
- Framerate:
  - analog NTSC compatible : 29.97 or 23.976 frames per second
  - analog PAL/SECAM compatible : 25 frames per second
- Bitrate: 1,150 kilobits per second (constant bitrate)

Although many DVD video players support playback of VCDs, VCD video is only compatible with the DVD-Video standard if encoded at 29.97 frames per second or 25 frames per second.

The 352×240 and 352×288 (or SIF) resolutions, when compared to the CCIR 601 specifications (defining the appropriate parameters for digital encoding of NTSC and PAL/SECAM TV signals), are reduced by half in all aspects: height, width, frame-rate, and chrominance.

=== Audio ===
Audio specifications

- Compression: MPEG-1 Audio Layer II (MP2)
- Sample Frequency: 44,100 hertz (44.1 kHz)
- Output: Dual channel, stereo, or Dolby Surround
- Bitrate: 224 kilobits per second (constant bitrate)

As with most CD-based formats, VCD audio is incompatible with the DVD-Video standard due to a difference in sampling frequency; DVDs require 48 kHz, whereas VCDs use 44.1 kHz.

=== Advantages of compression ===
By compressing both the video and audio streams, a VCD is able to hold 74 minutes of picture and sound information, the same duration as a standard 74 minute audio CD. The MPEG-1 compression used records mostly the differences between successive video frames, rather than write out each frame individually. Similarly, the audio frequency range is limited to those sounds most clearly heard by the human ear.

=== Other features ===
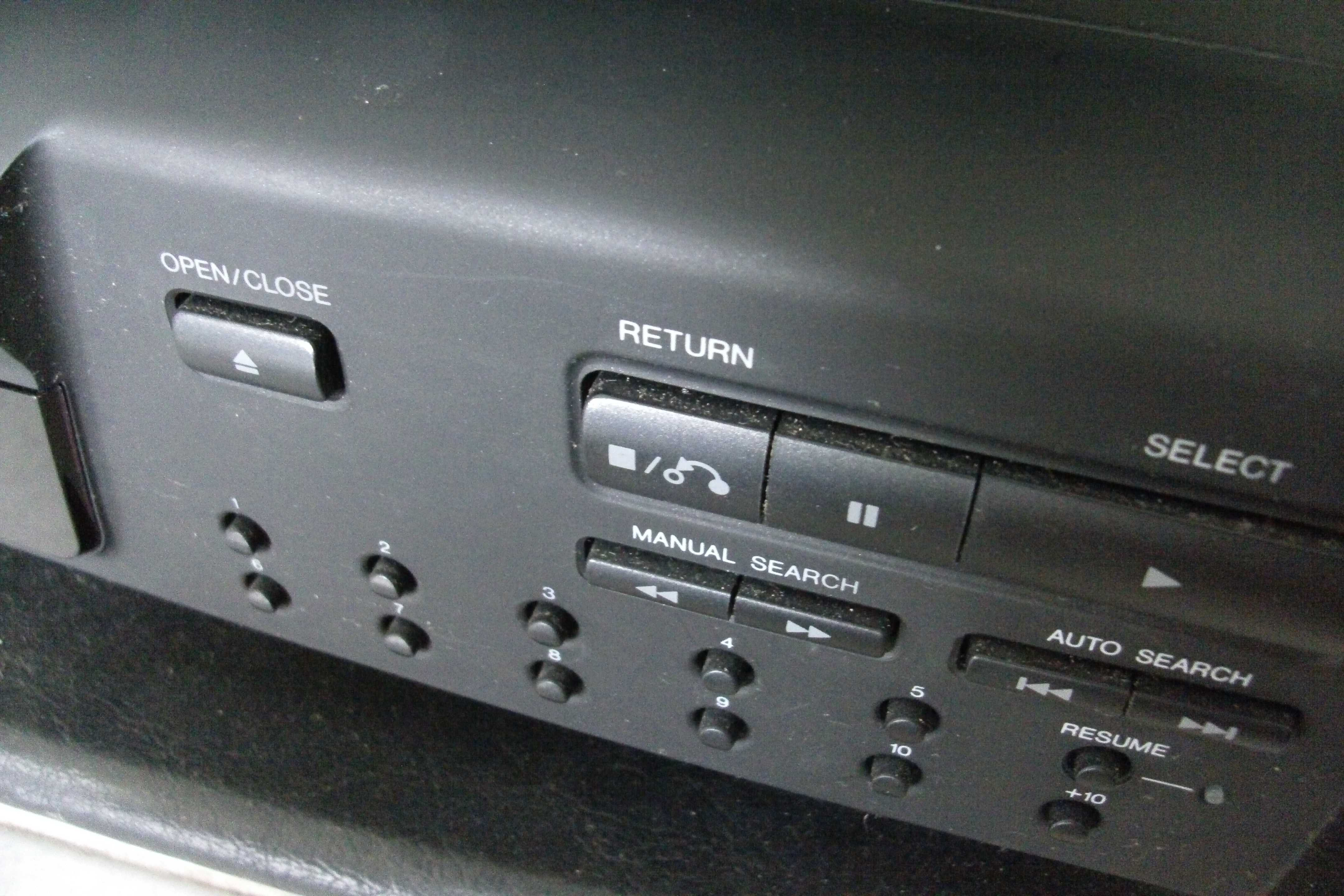
PlayBack Control (PBC) added in VCD 2.0 requires a special 'Return' button

The VCD standard also features the option of DVD-quality still images/slide shows with audio, at resolutions of 704×480 (480i, analog NTSC compatible) or 704×576 (576i, analog PAL/SECAM compatible). Version 2.0 also adds the playback control (PBC), featuring a simple menu like DVD-Video.

== Similar formats ==
=== CD-i Digital Video ===
Shortly before the advent of White Book VCD, Philips started releasing movies in the Green Book CD-i format, calling the subformat CD-i Digital Video (CD-i DV). While these used a similar format (MPEG-1), due to minor differences between the standards these discs are not compatible with VCD players. Philips' CD-i players with the Full Motion Video MPEG-1 decoder cartridge would play both formats. Approximately 30 CD-i DV titles were released before the company switched to the current VCD format for publishing movies in 1994.

=== XVCD ===
XVCD (eXtended Video CD) is the name generally given to any format that stores MPEG-1 video on a compact disc in CD-ROM XA Mode 2 Form 2, but does not strictly follow the VCD standard in terms of the encoding of the video or audio.

A normal VCD is encoded to MPEG-1 at a constant bit rate (CBR), so all scenes are required to use exactly the same data rate, regardless of complexity. However, video on an XVCD is typically encoded at a variable bit rate (VBR), so complex scenes can use a much higher data rate for a short time, while simpler scenes will use lower data rates. Some XVCDs use lower bitrates in order to fit longer videos onto the disc, while others use higher bitrates to improve quality. MPEG-2 may be used instead of MPEG-1.

To further reduce the data rate without significantly reducing quality, the size of the GOP can be increased, a different MPEG-1 quantization matrix can be used, the maximum data rate can be exceeded, and the bit rate of the MP2 audio can be reduced or even be swapped out completely for MP3 audio. These changes can be advantageous for those who want to either maximize video quality, or use fewer discs.

=== KVCD ===
KVCD (K Video Compression Dynamics) is an XVCD variant that requires the use of a proprietary quantization matrix, created by Karl Wagner and made available for non-commercial use. In addition to standard VCD resolutions, KVCD allows for non-standard resolutions like 528×480/576, though hardware support for KVCDs authored with these resolutions is limited.

=== DVCD ===
DVCD or Double VCD is a method to accommodate longer videos on a CD. A non-standard CD is overburned to include up to 100 minutes of video. However, some CD-ROM drives and players have problems reading these CDs, mostly because the groove spacing is outside specifications and the player's laser servo is unable to track it.

=== DVI ===
DVI (Digital Video Interactive) is a compression technique that stored 72 minutes of video on a CD-ROM. In 1998, Intel acquired the technology from RCA's Sarnoff Research Labs. DVI never caught on.

=== SVCD ===
Super Video CD is a format intended to be the successor of VCD, offering better quality of image and sound. The format uses MPEG-2 video at 480x480 or 480x576 and supports multiple bitrate and channel options for encoding audio.

== Adoption ==
=== In North America ===
Video CDs were unable to gain acceptance as a mainstream format in North America, chiefly because the established VHS format was less expensive, offered comparable video quality, and could be recorded over. The advent of recordable CDs, inexpensive recorders, and compatible DVD players spurred VCD acceptance in the US in the late 1990s and early 2000s. However, DVD burners and DVD-Video recorders were available by that time, and equipment and media costs for making DVD-Video fell rapidly. DVD-Video, with its longer run time and much higher quality, quickly overshadowed VCD in areas that could afford it. In addition many early DVD players could not read recordable (CD-R) media, and this limited the compatibility of home-made VCDs.

=== In Asia ===
The VCD format was very popular throughout Asia (except Japan and South Korea) in the late 1990s through the 2000s, with 8 million VCD players sold in China in 1997 alone, and more than half of all Chinese households owning at least one VCD player by 2005. However, popularity has declined over the years, as the number of Hong Kong factories that produced VCDs dropped from 98 in 1999 to 26 in 2012.

This popularity was due, in part, to most households not already owning VCRs when VCDs were introduced, the low price of the players, their tolerance of high humidity (a notable problem for VHS tapes), easy storage and maintenance, and the lower-cost media. Western sources have cited unauthorized content as a principal incentive for VCD player ownership.

VCDs are often produced and sold in Asian countries and regions, such as China, Hong Kong, Taiwan, Singapore, Malaysia, Thailand, Cambodia, Laos, Brunei, Myanmar, Indonesia, Philippines, Vietnam, Bangladesh, India, Turkey, Pakistan and Afghanistan. In many Asian countries, major Hollywood studios (and Asian home video distributors) have licensed companies to officially produce and distribute the VCDs, such as Intercontinental Video Ltd. of Hong Kong, Sunny Video and Speedy Video in Malaysia, Vision Interprima Pictures in Indonesia, CVD International, APS Intermusic Co. Ltd and Pacific Marketing and Entertainment Group in Thailand, Excel Home Entertainment in India, Berjaya-HVN and InnoForm Media in both Malaysia and Singapore, Scorpio East Entertainment in Singapore, as well as Viva Video, Magnavision Home Video, and C-Interactive Digital Entertainment in the Philippines. Legal Video CDs can often be found in established video stores and major book outlets in most Asian countries. They are typically packaged in jewel cases like commercial CDs, though higher-profile films may be released in keep cases, differentiated by the VCD logo.

In Asia, the use of VCDs as carriers for karaoke music is very common. One channel would feature a mono track with music and singing, another channel a pure instrumental version for karaoke singing. Prior to this, karaoke music was carried on LaserDiscs.

=== Worldwide trends ===
VCD's growth had slowed in areas that could afford DVD-Video, which offered most of the same advantages, as well as better picture quality (higher resolution with fewer digital compression artifacts) due to its larger storage capacity. However, VCD had simultaneously seen significant growth in emerging economies such as India, Indonesia and most countries in Africa and South America as a low-cost alternative to DVD. As of 2004, the worldwide popularity of VCD was increasing.

== Compared with VHS ==
Overall picture quality is intended to be comparable to VHS video. Poorly compressed VCD video can sometimes be of lower quality than VHS video, for example exhibiting VCD block artifacts (rather than the analog noise seen in VHS sources), but does not deteriorate further with each use. Producing video CDs involves stripping out high- and low-frequency sounds from the video, resulting in lower audio quality than VHS. While both formats need fast-forwarding to find certain scenes, rewinding to the beginning upon reaching the end is not required in VCD. The resolution is just half below that of common VHS resolution.

Video CDs did not come with closed captioning (on-screen text to aid viewers with hearing problems). When watching a film that exceeds 74 minutes (nearly 1 1/4 hours), the maximum video capacity of one disc, a viewer had to change the disc upon reaching halfway (unless the discs were played on a VCD changer that could hold multiple discs and play them automatically in succession), whereas a single VHS tape could hold 3.5 hours of continuous video.

== Compared with DVD ==
Films released on VCD can come on as many as 3 discs, depending on the length of the film; cases of VCDs are shaped like those of audio CDs

When playing a DVD, the viewer is taken to a main menu which gives them options (watch the feature film, view "deleted scenes", play some special applications, etc.). VCDs are usually straightforward; playing them often goes directly to the video with extras (mostly trailers and commercials) taking place before or after it, like on a VHS cassette.

Subtitles are found on many Asian VCDs but cannot be removed, unlike on DVDs. The subtitles are embedded on the video during the encoding process ("hardsubbed"). It is not uncommon to find a VCD with subtitles for two languages.

Though the VCD technology can support it, most films carried on VCDs do not contain chapters, requiring the viewer to fast-forward to resume the program after playback has been stopped. This is mostly because VCD technology is able to start playback at a chapter point but there is nothing to signal to the player that the chapter has changed during a program. This can be confusing for the user as the player will indicate that it is still playing chapter 1 when it has played through to chapter 2 or later. Pressing the Next button would cause playback from the beginning of chapter 2. However, preview material is sometimes stored in a separate chapter, followed by a single chapter for the film.

VCDs are often bilingual. Because they feature stereo audio, disc players have an option to play only the left or right audio channel. On some films, they feature English on the left audio channel and Cantonese on the right; more commonly Hong Kong VCDs will feature Mandarin on one channel and Cantonese on the other. This is similar to selecting a language track on a DVD, except it is limited to two languages, due to there being only two audio channels (left and right). The audio track effectively becomes monaural.

VCDs' most noticeable disadvantage compared to DVD is image quality, due both to the more aggressive compression necessary to fit video into such a small capacity as well as to the compression method used. Additionally, VCD movie surround sound capability is limited to Dolby Surround matrixed within the stereo tracks, while DVDs are capable of six channels of discrete surround sound via Dolby Digital AC-3.

== Hardware and software support ==
Early devices supporting Video CD playback include the Philips CD-i systems, Sega Saturn, and the Amiga CD-32 (albeit via an optional decoder card). Disc playback is also available both natively and as an option on some CD- and DVD-based video game consoles, including the original PlayStation (only on the SCPH-5903 model).

Early software supporting Video CD playback include XingMPEG. Early PC hardware supporting Video CD playback include proprietary VCD decoder card. Later, because the introduction of Pentium II processor which supports MMX extension, and later graphics cards had included video decoding function, the use of VCD decoder card declined.

VLC is a free, open-source media player software which supports VCD on Windows, MacOS, Linux and BSD.

Windows Media Player prior to version 9 does not support playing VCD directly. Windows Vista added native support of VCD along with DVD-Video and can launch the preferred application upon insertion. The disc format is also supported natively by Media Player Classic, VLC Media Player and MPlayer. Discs may include software for playing back VCD on operating systems that do not support it natively, which can be bundled by the authoring software.

QuickTime Player also does not support playing VCD directly, though it can play the .DAT files (stored under \MPEGAV for video and audio data) reliably, and plugins were available.

Direct access playback support is available within Windows XP MCE, Windows Vista and newer (including Windows 10), classic Mac OS, BSD, macOS, and Linux among others, either directly or with updates and compatible software.

Most DVD players are compatible with VCDs, and VCD-only players are available throughout Asia, and online through many shopping sites. Some older Blu-ray and HD-DVD players also retained support, as do CBHD players as well. However, most Blu-ray players, most vehicle audio with DVD/Blu-ray support, Xbox family, and Sony PlayStation family (except SCPH-5903 model of PlayStation) cannot play VCDs because the player software does not have support for MPEG-1 video and audio; the player software lacks the ability to read MPEG-1 stream in DAT files alongside MPEG-1 stream in standard MPEG, AVI, and Matroska files; or the player lacks the ability to read CD-ROM XA discs. Some Laserdisc players that were released in the late 90s support VCD, as does the Sony PS1 model SCPH-5903 marketed in Southeast Asia. The Sega Saturn has an MPEG-1 decoder card, which allows for VCD playback as well as MPEG-1 video on select games. However, it wasn’t released in North America.

Authoring software for VCD and SVCD includes Nero Video for Windows and VCD Imager for Linux.
