= QDesign =

Company which developed digital audio compression technologies

QDesign Corporation was a developer of digital audio compression technologies. The company's MP2 and MP3 technologies were used in professional audio and broadcast automation systems as well as multimedia and video production systems. QDesign developed a music codec, originally known as LBpack. QDesign licensed the initial version of the codec and created the official audio compression in Apple Computer's QuickTime v3.

The personal version comes with QuickTime Pro and allows encoding at bitrates up to 48 kbit/s. The professional version allows bitrates up to 128 kbit/s.

Apple steered away from proprietary codecs in QuickTime like Sorenson Video and QDesign, and focused on standards like (MPEG-4). In recent years, usage of QDMC (= QDesign Music Codec) has generally given way to AAC.

The company also developed "QDX", a proprietary audio format targeted at providing the music industry with a solution to secure digital music distribution. The company was acquired in 2004 by DTS.
