= Lossless predictive audio compression =

Lossless predictive audio compression (LPAC) is an improved lossless audio compression algorithm developed by Tilman Liebchen, Marcus Purat and Peter Noll at the Institute for Telecommunications, Technische Universität Berlin (TU Berlin), to compress PCM audio in a lossless manner, in contrast to lossy compression algorithms.

It is no longer developed because an advanced version of it has become an official standard under the name of MPEG-4 Audio Lossless Coding.

== See also ==
- Free Lossless Audio Codec (FLAC)
- Lossless Transform Audio Compression (LTAC)
- Monkey's Audio (APE)
