= Qoi =

Qoi or QOI may refer to:

- QoI or quinone outside inhibitors, a type of fungicide
- QOI (image format)
- Quality of life
- Qoi, Tibet
