= Non-solid =

Non-solid or nonsolid may refer to:

- Non-solid, anything not in a solid state of matter
- Non-solid archive format, in solid compression computer file data compression
- In computer graphics, a non-solid is a virtual object that does not collide with other objects (see collision detection)
- Non-solid projection screen, in video technology
