= LTAC =

The acronym LTAC can designate:

- Lossless Transform Audio Compression
- Literary Translators' Association of Canada
- Long-Term Acute Care facility

LTAC may also refer to:

- The ICAO airport code for Esenboğa International Airport.
- The Ltac tactic language embedded in the Rocq proof assistant
