= Lossy data conversion =

Generally, lossy data conversion refers to the conversion of data from one storage format to another in a way that doesn't allow the exact recovery of the original data. In particular, it can refer to lossy type conversion, where some values in the original type cannot be represented in the target type, or to lossy file conversion, where the target format does not support all the feature of the original format.

== File conversion ==
Such conversions are typically used between incompatible software or as the export target of edition tools. Most of the time, the document saved in the lossy format will look identical, but the conversion can also cause some loss in fidelity or functionality.

=== Types of lossy conversion ===
There are three basic types of lossy data conversion:

- With in-place lossy data conversion, software packages such as IBM's Lotus Domino transform a proprietary rich text format into a web standard HTML as the page is requested. Because the page is served up just in time, it can rely on the existence of the software package to handle specialized data features that may not be available in the new format natively. On the other hand, the converted data may not be usable outside of the in-place context.
- With file export lossy data conversion, software packages allow either a File Export to the new data storage format, or a File Save to the new data storage format. The former leaves the original content in its original format and creates a new lossy version in the named file. The latter changes the format of the existing file.
- With extraction lossy data conversion, software packages take content stored by a different software package and extract out the content to the desired format. This may allow data to be extracted in a format not recognized by the original software package.

=== Other types of data ===
Graphic data (images) is often converted from one data storage format to another. Such conversions are usually described separately as either lossy data compression or lossless data compression.

== See also ==
- Round-trip format conversion
- Transcoding
