= BCJ =

BCJ may refer to

- Bachelor of Communication and Journalism
- Bachelor of Criminal Justice
- Bach Collegium Japan
- Bohlin Cywinski Jackson
- BCJ (algorithm), a method of improving the compression of machine code
