= OptimFROG =

Lossless audio compression codec

- Developer: Florin Ghido
- Stable release: 5.100 / September 2, 2016; 9 years ago
- Operating system: FreeBSD, Linux, OS X, Microsoft Windows
- Type: Audio codec
- Website: losslessaudio.org

OptimFROG Audio file format
- Filename extensions: .off (OptimFROG Float); .ofr (OptimFROG Lossless); .ofs (OptimFROG Small, a/k/a DualStream)
- Internet media type: audio/x-off audio/x-ofr audio/x-ofs
- Developed by: Florin Ghido
- Initial release: December 20, 2001; 24 years ago
- Latest release: 5.100; September 2, 2016; 9 years ago
- Type of format: Audio codec
- Compression: Lossless/lossy hybrid
- Open format?: No
- Free format?: Yes
- Website: losslessaudio.org

OptimFROG is a proprietary, lossless audio codec developed by Florin Ghido. OptimFROG is optimized for high compression (small file sizes) at the expense of encoding and decoding speed, and consistently measures among the highest compressing lossless codecs. OptimFROG comes with three compressors: a lossless codec for integer LPCM format in WAV files, one for IEEE 754 floating-point WAV files, and third codec called DualStream.

OptimFROG DualStream is lossy, but fills the gap between perceptual coding and lossless coding by producing a correction file. In combination with the main, lossy-encoded file, the correction file provides for lossless decoding. The lossless decoding is computationally intense and cannot be done in real time on contemporary hardware. The rival audio codecs WavPack, MPEG-4 SLS, and DTS-HD Master Audio also offer correction file generation.

The OptimFROG file formats use APEv2 tags to store the metadata. ID3 is also possible.
