= MPEG-4 SLS =

Extension to the MPEG-4 Audio standard

Scalable Lossless Coding
- Developed by: ISO
- Initial release: June 2006; 20 years ago
- Latest release: ISO/IEC 14496-3:2019; December 2019; 6 years ago
- Type of format: Lossless audio
- Contained by: MP4
- Standard: ISO/IEC 14496-3
- Open format?: Yes
- Free format?: No

MPEG4-SLS
- Filename extension: .m4a

MPEG-4 SLS, or MPEG-4 Scalable to Lossless as per ISO/IEC 14496-3:2005/Amd 3:2006 (Scalable Lossless Coding), is an extension to the MPEG-4 Part 3 (MPEG-4 Audio) standard to allow lossless audio compression scalable to lossy MPEG-4 General Audio coding methods (e.g., variations of AAC). It was developed jointly by the Institute for Infocomm Research (I^{2}R) and Fraunhofer, which commercializes its implementation of a limited subset of the standard under the name of HD-AAC. Standardization of the HD-AAC profile for MPEG-4 Audio is under development (as of September 2009).

MPEG-4 SLS allows having both a lossy layer and a lossless correction layer similar to Wavpack Hybrid, OptimFROG DualStream and DTS-HD Master Audio, providing backwards compatibility to MPEG AAC-compliant bitstreams. MPEG-4 SLS can also work without a lossy layer (a.k.a. "SLS Non-Core"), in which case it will not be backwards compatible, Lossy compression of files is necessary for files that need to be streamed to the Internet or played in devices with limited storage.

With digital rights management (DRM), ripping of the lossless data or playback on non-DRM-enabled devices could be disabled.

MPEG-4 SLS is not related in any way to MPEG-4 ALS (Audio Lossless Coding).

== Background ==
New lossless audio coding technologies that need higher bandwidth and larger storage capacities may now be appropriate for many applications and have been gaining attention in recent years. In addressing this need, MPEG issued a Call for Proposals (CfP) in October 2002 to solicit a technology that could address all these needs.

The CfP requested proposals for a lossless and scalable technology that was backward compatible with the existing MPEG AAC codec, and could operate efficiently at several different sampling rates and word length combinations. Institute for Infocomm Research (I2R) technologies were adopted for the scalable to lossless coding (14496-3/AMD5) architecture Reference Model 0.

I2R offers a fully scalable to lossless audio coding solution. On top of the core AAC codec, a scalable extension layer increases the signal-to-noise ratio, reaching lossless quality at data rates comparable to those of current pure lossless audio codecs, that is, at average compression ratios of about 58%.

The scalability of the extension makes this combination a coding solution for production environments, where the result is to be transmitted to several recipients through channels of differing bandwidth. Furthermore, for private and professional use in music archives, this enables storing the original music data and transferring compressed copies (e.g. to portable devices) without transcoding.

== Licensing ==
The Licensing Administrator for the MPEG-4 Audio patent pool is Via Licensing Corporation. Licensors offering their SLS patents through the Via Licensing Corporation's licensing program include A*STAR Exploit Technologies Pte Ltd (Singapore), Fraunhofer IIS (Germany), and Nippon Telegraph and Telephone Corporation (Japan).

The licensing fees varies - e.g. a licensee shall pay $0.098 to the Via Licensing Corporation for each copy of PC software decoder sold or supplied.

== Releases ==
In 2011, Los Angeles based hip hop group People Under The Stairs released Highlighter, the first commercial HD-AAC release taken directly from 24 to 48 session files, encoded and sold directly to fans via the website PL70.net

== See also ==
- Bitrate peeling, in Ogg Vorbis
- WavPack, and OptimFROG DualStream, other formats with lossy + correction
