= Canterbury corpus =

Data compression test corpus

The Canterbury corpus is a collection of files intended for use as a benchmark for testing lossless data compression algorithms. It was created in 1997 at the University of Canterbury, New Zealand and designed to replace the Calgary corpus. The files were selected based on their ability to provide representative performance results.

== Contents ==
In its most commonly used form, the corpus consists of 11 files, selected as "average" documents from 11 classes of documents, totaling 2,810,784 bytes as follows.

| Size (bytes) | File name | Description |
|---|---|---|
| 152,089 | alice29.txt | English text |
| 125,179 | asyoulik.txt | Shakespeare |
| 24,603 | cp.html | HTML source |
| 11,150 | fields.c | C source |
| 3,721 | grammar.lsp | LISP source |
| 1,029,744 | kennedy.xls | Excel spreadsheet |
| 426,754 | lcet10.txt | Technical writing |
| 481,861 | plrabn12.txt | Poetry (Paradise Lost) |
| 513,216 | ptt5 | CCITT test set |
| 38,240 | sum | SPARC executable |
| 4,227 | xargs.1 | GNU manual page |

The University of Canterbury also offers the following corpora. Additional files may be added, so results should be only reported for individual files.

- The Artificial Corpus, a set of files with highly "artificial" data designed to evoke pathological or worst-case behavior. Last updated 2000 (tar timestamp).
- The Large Corpus, a set of large (megabyte-size) files. Contains an E. coli genome, a King James bible, and the CIA world fact book. Last updated 1997 (tar timestamp).
- The Miscellaneous Corpus. Contains one million digits of pi. Last updated 2000 (tar timestamp).

== See also ==
- Data compression
