= Diagnostically acceptable irreversible compression =

Diagnostically acceptable irreversible compression (DAIC) is the amount of lossy compression which can be used on a medical image such that there is no negative impact on the ability of a human or algorithm to perform a particular diagnostic task (contribute to making a medical diagnosis using the image).

The term was first introduced at a workshop on irreversible compression convened by the European Society of Radiology (ESR) in Palma de Mallorca October 13, 2010, the results of which were reported in a subsequent position paper.

DAIC is distinct from visually lossless lossy compression, which may not be necessary, or sufficient, for a particular diagnostic task.

== Determination ==
It is not a trivial problem to establish the criteria for whether or not a particular implementation of a particular irreversible compression scheme applied with particular parameters to a particular individual image, or category of images, avoids the introduction of some quantifiable risk of a diagnostic error for any particular diagnostic task.

The "amount of compression" in irreversible compression is sometimes crudely approximated by the compression ratio or bit rate, where the acceptable amount is then specified by the algorithm (typically JPEG or J2K) and the application (clinical question, body part and imaging method). Such a definition is easy to follow, and has been used by medical bodies in 2010 around the world.

However, the compression ratio correlates poorly with the real quality of the image. Different compression implementations can produce very different quality for the same file size. For example, the JPEG encoding format of 1992 can perform almost as well as many modern formats when using newer optimization techniques exploited in jpegli, mozjpeg and ISO libjpeg. Yet these different approaches using the same nominal format would be lumped together with legacy encoders without such optimizations, if categorized by scheme alone.

The image compression community has long attempted to use quantitative nominally objective methods like PSNR and SSIM to measure the effects of compression as a surrogate for human observer preference, perception, or performance, and the same techniques are applicable to medical images, whether greyscale or color (the latter presenting additional challenges). The ESR review of 2010 concluded that it is still difficult to establish a criterion for whether a particular irreversible compression scheme applied with particular parameters to a particular individual image, or category of images, avoids the introduction of some quantifiable risk of a diagnostic error for any particular diagnostic task. The literature contains numerous objective metrics and evaluations of their efficacy, but there is no universally accepted single metric applicable to all image types and applications, including those involving AI; indeed the impact of compression on the performance of AI algorithms serves as a quantitative metric in its own right.
