= Audio Lossless Coding =

Lossless audio coding format

- Developed by: ISO
- Initial release: March 2006; 19 years ago
- Latest release: RM23; 2009; 16 years ago
- Type of format: Lossless audio
- Contained by: MP4
- Standard: ISO/IEC 14496-3
- Open format?: Yes
- Free format?: No

MPEG-4 Audio Lossless Coding, also known as MPEG-4 ALS, is an extension to the MPEG-4 Part 3 audio standard to allow lossless audio compression. The extension was finalized in December 2005 and published as ISO/IEC 14496-3:2005/Amd 2:2006 in 2006. The latest description of MPEG-4 ALS was published as subpart 11 of the MPEG-4 Audio standard (ISO/IEC 14496-3:2019) (5th edition) in December 2019.

MPEG-4 ALS combines a short-term predictor and a long term predictor. The short-term predictor is similar to FLAC in its operation – it is a quantized LPC predictor with a losslessly coded residual using Golomb Rice Coding or Block Gilbert Moore Coding (BGMC). The long term predictor is modeled by 5 long-term weighted residues, each with its own lag (delay). The lag can be hundreds of samples. This predictor improves the compression for sounds with rich harmonics (containing multiples of a single fundamental frequency, locked in phase) present in many musical instruments and human voice.

== Features ==
- Support for PCM resolutions of up to 32-bit including floating-point
- Arbitrary sampling rates
- Multi-channel / multi-track support (up to 65536 channels)
- Streaming
- Seekable (fast random access to any part of the encoded data).
- Optional storage in MP4 file format; can be multiplexed with video and other media content supported by the MP4 container.
- An MPEG-4 Audio profile "ALS Simple Profile", invoked with "-sp1" in the reference encoder.

== Software support ==
As of 2020, there has not been wide acceptance of this format, possibly due to the lack of encoders and decoders available.

A reference implementation of MPEG-4 ALS encoder and decoder (mp4als – e.g. mp4alsRM23) can be obtained at the MPEG-4 ALS homepage and it was also published as ISO/IEC 14496-5:2001/Amd 10:2007/Cor 3:2009.

There is a MPEG-4 ALS Decoder plugin for Winamp player.

On November 11, 2009, the FFmpeg open source project gained an MPEG-4 ALS decoder in its development version. Only a subset of the format is currently supported.

== History ==
In July 2002, the Moving Picture Experts Group issued a call for proposals of lossless audio coding procedures to be sent in before December. Seven companies submitted their proposals which were examined taking into consideration compression efficiency, complexity and flexibility. By July 2003, Lossless Predictive Audio Compression (LPAC) was selected as the first draft for the future standard. The reference model was further developed under participation of Technische Universität Berlin (TUB), RealNetworks, and Nippon Telegraph and Telephone (NTT).

== See also ==
- Lossless predictive audio compression (predecessor)
- Lossless Transform Audio Compression (pre-predecessor)
- MPEG-4 SLS (MPEG-4 Scalable Lossless Coding)
- MPEG-4
