= Lossless Transform Audio Compression =

Lossless Transform Audio Compression (LTAC) is a compression algorithm developed by Tilman Liebchen, Marcus Purat and Peter Noll at Institute for Telecommunications, Technische Universität Berlin (TU Berlin), to compress PCM audio in a lossless manner, unlike conventional lossy audio compression algorithms (like MP3).

LTAC will not be developed any further since it has been superseded by its successor lossless predictive audio compression (LPAC), which is based on linear prediction. This makes it much faster than LTAC and even leads to better compression results. LPAC has become official standard as MPEG-4 Audio Lossless Coding.
