= Solid compression =

Method of data compression

A tar.gz is created by joining the files in tar and then compressing with gzip.

In computing, solid compression is a method for data compression of multiple files, wherein all the uncompressed files are concatenated and treated as a single data block. Such an archive is called a solid archive. It is used natively in the 7z and RAR formats, as well as indirectly in tar-based formats such as .tar.gz and .tar.bz2. By contrast, the ZIP format is not solid because it stores separately compressed files (though solid compression can be emulated for small archives by combining the files into an uncompressed archive file and then compressing that archive file inside a second compressed ZIP file).

== Explanation ==
Compressed file formats often feature both compression (storing the data in a small space) and archiving (storing multiple files and metadata in a single file). One can combine these in two natural ways:

- compress the individual files, and then archive into a single file;
- archive into a single data block, and then compress.

The order matters (these operations do not commute), and the latter is solid compression.

In Unix, compression and archiving are traditionally separate operations, which allows one to understand this distinction:

- Compressing individual files and then archiving would be a tar of gzip-compressed files – this is very uncommon.
- Archiving various uncompressed files via tar and then compressing yields a compressed archive: a .tar.gz file – this is solid compression.

A rough graphical representation:
In this example, three files each have a common part with the same information, a unique part with information not in the other files, and an "air" part with low-entropy and accordingly well-compressible information.

original file A

common	unique	air

original file B

common	unique	air

original file C

common	unique	air

non solid archive:

common	A	common	B	common	C

solid archive:

common	A	B	C

== Rationale ==
=== Benefits ===
Solid compression allows for much better compression rates when all the files are similar, which is often the case if they are of the same file format. It can also be efficient when archiving a large number of small files.

=== Costs ===
On the other hand, getting a single file out of a solid archive requires processing all the files before it, so modifying solid archives could be slow and inconvenient. On newer formats such as 7-zip, there is a solid block size option that allows for the concatenated data block to be split into individually-compressed smaller blocks, so that only a limited amount of data in the block must be processed in order to extract one file. Parameters control the maximum solid block window size, the number of files in a block, and whether blocks are separated by file extension.

Additionally, if the archive becomes even slightly damaged, some of the data (sometimes even all data) after the damaged part in the block can be unusable (depending on the compression and archiving format), whereas in a non-solid archive format, usually only one file is unusable and the subsequent files can usually still be extracted.
