= Transrating =

Transrating is the process by which video files and audio files are converted to a reduced bit rate while still maintaining the original media format. This enables users to fit particular media into a much smaller storage space or to deliver the media files more efficiently using reduced bandwidth. This process can include conversion of the sample rate, but may also use the original sampling rate combined with more compression.

The increased popularity of mobile video viewing, on sites such as YouTube, has led to an increased demand for translating. Using this video optimization technology is important for being able to deliver high resolution content quickly and smoothly. The widespread availability of high definition screens on smartphones like iPhone and Android devices, combined with high-speed 4G networks have brought high-resolution mobile video into the mainstream, leading to an explosion of video traffic.
