= Prediction by partial matching =

Data compression technique

Prediction by partial matching (PPM) is an adaptive statistical data compression technique based on context modeling and prediction. PPM models use a set of previous symbols in the uncompressed symbol stream to predict the next symbol in the stream. PPM algorithms can also be used to cluster data into predicted groupings in cluster analysis.

== Theory ==
Predictions are usually reduced to symbol rankings. Each symbol (a letter, bit or any other amount of data) is ranked before it is compressed, and the ranking system determines the corresponding codeword (and therefore the compression rate). In many compression algorithms, the ranking is equivalent to probability mass function estimation. Given the previous letters (or given a context), each symbol is assigned with a probability. For instance, in arithmetic coding the symbols are ranked by their probabilities to appear after previous symbols, and the whole sequence is compressed into a single fraction that is computed according to these probabilities.

The number of previous symbols, n, determines the order of the PPM model which is denoted as PPM(n). Unbounded variants where the context has no length limitations also exist and are denoted as PPM*. If no prediction can be made based on all n context symbols, a prediction is attempted with n − 1 symbols. This process is repeated until a match is found or no more symbols remain in context. At that point a fixed prediction is made.

Much of the work in optimizing a PPM model is handling inputs that have not already occurred in the input stream. The obvious way to handle them is to create a "never-seen" symbol which triggers the escape sequence. But what probability should be assigned to a symbol that has never been seen? This is called the zero-frequency problem. One variant uses the Laplace estimator, which assigns the "never-seen" symbol a fixed pseudocount of one. A variant called PPMd increments the pseudocount of the "never-seen" symbol every time the "never-seen" symbol is used. (In other words, PPMd estimates the probability of a new symbol as the ratio of the number of unique symbols to the total number of symbols observed).

== Implementation ==
PPM compression implementations vary greatly in other details. The actual symbol selection is usually recorded using arithmetic coding, though it is also possible to use Huffman encoding or even some type of dictionary coding technique. The underlying model used in most PPM algorithms can also be extended to predict multiple symbols. It is also possible to use non-Markov modeling to either replace or supplement Markov modeling. The symbol size is usually static, typically a single byte, which makes generic handling of any file format easy.

The PPM family of algorithms originated with work by John G. Cleary and Ian H. Witten, who described adaptive coding using partial string matching in 1984. Their experiments reported compression of mixed-case English text to as little as 2.2 bits per character.

PPMd is a public domain implementation of PPMII (PPM with information inheritance) by Dmitry Shkarin which has undergone several incompatible revisions. It is used in the RAR file format by default. It is also available in the 7z and zip file formats.

Attempts to improve PPM algorithms led to the PAQ series of data compression algorithms.

A PPM algorithm, rather than being used for compression, is used to increase the efficiency of user input in the alternate input method program Dasher.

== See also ==
- Language model – Statistical model of language
- n-gram – Item sequences in computational linguistics

== Sources ==
- Cleary, J.; Witten, I. (April 1984). "Data Compression Using Adaptive Coding and Partial String Matching". IEEE Trans. Commun. 32 (4): 396–402. CiteSeerX 10.1.1.14.4305. doi:10.1109/TCOM.1984.1096090.
- Moffat, A. (November 1990). "Implementing the PPM data compression scheme". IEEE Trans. Commun. 38 (11): 1917–1921. CiteSeerX 10.1.1.120.8728. doi:10.1109/26.61469.
- Cleary, J. G.; Teahan, W. J.; Witten, I. H. (1997). "Unbounded length contexts for PPM". The Computer Journal. 40 (2_and_3). Oxford, England: Oxford University Press: 67–75. doi:10.1093/comjnl/40.2_and_3.67. ISSN 0010-4620.
- C. Bloom, Solving the problems of context modeling.
- W.J. Teahan, Probability estimation for PPM, Original Source from archive.org.
- Schürmann, T.; Grassberger, P. (September 1996). "Entropy estimation of symbol sequences". Chaos. 6 (3): 414–427. arXiv:cond-mat/0203436. Bibcode:1996Chaos...6..414S. doi:10.1063/1.166191. PMID 12780271. S2CID 10090433.
