= DTS-HD Master Audio =

Lossless audio codec for home theater

DTS-HD Master Audio (DTS-HD MA; known as DTS++ before 2004) is a multi-channel, lossless audio codec developed by DTS as an extension of the lossy DTS Coherent Acoustics codec (DTS CA; usually itself referred to as just DTS). Rather than being an entirely new coding mechanism, DTS-HD MA encodes an audio master in lossy DTS first, then stores a concurrent stream of supplementary data representing whatever the DTS encoder discarded. This gives DTS-HD MA a lossy "core" able to be played back by devices that cannot decode the more complex lossless audio. DTS-HD MA's primary application is audio storage and playback for Blu-ray media; it competes in this respect with Dolby TrueHD, another lossless surround format.

== Specifications ==
DTS-HD MA can store up to 8 discrete channels of audio (7.1 surround) at up to a 24 bit sample depth and 192 kHz sampling frequency (96 kHz for 6.1 or 7.1 surround). Although DTS-HD MA, and the related DTS-HD, allow virtually any number of channels in the abstract, these limits are imposed for practical reasons of limited storage and bitrate availability. A DTS-HD MA bitstream may have a bitrate no greater than 24.5 Mbit/s (instantaneous), of which no greater than 1.5 Mbit/s may be lossy DTS (as per the DTS CA specification).

The Blu-ray specification stipulates DTS-HD MA as an optional codec, which means that some Blu-ray hardware may not decode it. This is the reason for the bifurcated nature of a DTS-HD MA audio stream; DTS CA, unlike its MA extension, is mandatory, so a player that is not MA-capable can automatically default to an MA-encoded disc's base DTS stream and simply ignore the supplementary data. Alternatively, even if a player is MA-capable, the base stream may be needed for backward compatibility with an older AV receiver (for example, one manufactured during the DVD era).

DTS-HD MA is the encoding format for DTS:X, an object-based surround-sound format that competes with Dolby Atmos. A DTS-HD MA bitstream carrying DTS:X can contain up to 9 simultaneous sound objects, which are dynamically mapped to a user's speaker system during playback, unlike the rigid number and placement of speakers required by channel-based surround (a DTS marketing executive referred to DTS:X in an interview as "whatever.1").

=== Encoding process ===
DTS-HD MA is encoded in three steps. First, the audio master is fed to a DTS CA encoder, which generates the core (lossy) audio stream. Next, this lossy audio is decoded and compared to the master, with "residual" data being recorded wherever the two differ. Finally, the residual data is compressed losslessly and merged with the core into one bitstream. A DTS-HD MA decoder simply performs this process in reverse.

DTS-HD MA audio, including DTS:X audio, can be created and edited using DTS's DTS:X Encoder Suite. The DTS-HD Master Audio Suite served the same function before the introduction of DTS:X, and can still be used for DTS-HD MA that does not carry DTS:X.

== AV transport ==
DTS-HD Master Audio may be transported to AV receivers in 5.1, 6.1, or 7.1 channels, in full quality, in one of three ways depending on player and/or receiver support:

- Over 6, 7 or 8 RCA connectors as analog audio, using the player's internal decoder and digital-to-analog converter (DAC).
- Over HDMI 1.1 (or higher) connections as 6-, 7-, or 8-channel linear PCM, using the player's decoder and the AV receiver's DAC.
- Over HDMI 1.3 (or higher) connections as the original DTS-HD Master Audio bitstream, with decoding and DAC both done by the AV receiver. (This is the transport mode required for DTS:X playback.)

S/PDIF (optical or coaxial) cannot carry linear PCM in more than 2 channels, and players connected this way typically output DTS-HD MA as either the lossy DTS core or downmixed stereo PCM.

The bitstream itself is not tied to HDMI, however: IEC 61937-5, the standard for carrying DTS bitstreams over the IEC 60958 (S/PDIF) interface, defines a packet type for DTS-HD (DTS type IV) with a selectable transmission rate. At 192 kHz, the highest sampling rate of S/PDIF, two 16-bit channels provide about 6.1 Mbit/s, compared with about 24.5 Mbit/s over HDMI's High Bitrate Audio mode (768 kHz); FFmpeg's IEC 61937 muxer implements DTS type IV output at a selectable rate. A DTS-HD MA stream can therefore be carried over S/PDIF as long as every frame fits within this limit. For 5.1 channels at 48 kHz and 24 bits (6.9 Mbit/s uncompressed), the lossless compression has to reduce each frame by at least about 11%; streams authored for Blu-ray, which may use up to 24.5 Mbit/s, are not guaranteed to fit. Whether a given player sends, or a given AV receiver accepts, DTS-HD over S/PDIF depends on the device.
