= ISO/IEC JTC 1/SC 2 =

Subcommittee for coded character sets

ISO/IEC JTC 1/SC 2 Coded character sets is a standardization subcommittee of the Joint Technical Committee ISO/IEC JTC 1 of the International Organization for Standardization (ISO) and the International Electrotechnical Commission (IEC), that develops and facilitates standards within the field of coded character sets. The international secretariat of ISO/IEC JTC 1/SC 2 is the Japanese Industrial Standards Committee (JISC), located in Japan. SC 2 is responsible for the development of the Universal Coded Character Set standard (ISO/IEC 10646), which is the international standard corresponding to the Unicode Standard.

== History ==
The subcommittee was established in 1987 under ISO/TC 97 as ISO/TC 97/SC 2, originally with the title "Character Sets and Information Coding", with the area of work being, "the standardization of bit and byte coded representation of information for interchange including among others, sets of graphic characters, of control functions, of picture elements and audio information coding of text for processing and interchange; code extension techniques; implementation of these coded representations on interchange media and transmission systems". When the Joint Technical Committee, ISO/IEC JTC 1, was established in 1987 as a merger between ISO/TC 97, Information Technology, and IEC/TC 83, the subcommittee was transferred into JTC 1, becoming ISO/IEC JTC 1/SC 2. Certain standards that are now under the jurisdiction of the ISO/IEC JTC 1/SC 2, such as ISO/IEC 646, were published before the creation of ISO/IEC JTC 1, under ISO/TC 97. The original working groups (WGs) of ISO/IEC JTC 1/SC 2 were:

- WG 1 "Code Extension Techniques"
- WG 2 "Multiple-octet Coded Character Set"
- WG 3 "7-bit and 8-bit Codes"
- WG 6 "Control Functions"
- WG 8 "Coded Representation of Picture and Audio Information"

In 1991, WG 8, which had held the JBIG, JPEG and MPEG experts activities, was promoted to become its own subcommittee, creating ISO/IEC JTC 1/SC 29. Over the years, the subcommittee has established or disbanded WGs in response to changing standardization needs within the field of coded character sets.

== Scope and mission ==
The scope of ISO/IEC JTC 1/SC 2 is "Standardization of graphic character sets and their characteristics, including:"

- String ordering
- Associated control functions
- Coded representation for information interchange
- Code extension techniques

Following the creation of ISO/IEC JTC 1/SC 29 in 1991, the scope of ISO/IEC JTC 1/SC 2 does not include audio and picture coding.

== Structure ==
ISO/IEC JTC 1/SC 2 has one active working group (WG), which maintains the standard for the Universal Coded Character Set (ISO/IEC 10646). The focus of this WG is described in the group's terms of reference. That WG is:

Working group	Working area
ISO/IEC JTC 1/SC 2/WG 2	Universal coded character set

The discontinuation of ISO/IEC JTC 1/SC 2/OWG-SORT was unanimously approved by resolution at the 2014 plenary meeting of ISO/IEC JTC 1/SC 2. The project, ISO/IEC 14651, which was allocated to ISO/IEC JTC 1/SC 2/OWG-SORT is now handled directly under ISO/IEC JTC 1/SC 2.

== Collaborations ==
ISO/IEC JTC 1/SC 2 works in close collaboration with a number of other organizations or subcommittees, both internal and external to ISO or IEC. Organizations internal to ISO or IEC that collaborate with or are in liaison to ISO/IEC JTC 1/SC 2 include:

- ISO/IEC JTC 1/SC 22, Programming languages, their environments and system software interfaces
- ISO/IEC JTC 1/SC 29, Coding of audio, picture, multimedia and hypermedia information
- ISO/IEC JTC 1/SC 34, Document description and processing languages
- ISO/IEC JTC 1/SC 35, User interfaces
- ISO/TC 37/SC 2, Terminographical and lexicographical working methods
- ISO/TC 46/SC 4, Technical interoperability
- ISO/TC 211, Geographic information/Geomatics
- ISO/TC 215, Health informatics

Some organizations external to ISO or IEC that collaborate with or are in liaison to ISO/IEC JTC 1/SC 2 include:

- Consultative Committee for Space Data Systems (CCSDS)
- Internet Engineering Task Force (IETF)/Internet Society (ISOC)
- International Telecommunication Union - Telecommunication Standardization Sector (ITU-T)
- Commission of European Communities (EC|CEC)
- United Nations Conference on Trade and Development (UNCTAD)
- United Nations Economic Commission for Europe (UN-ECE)
- World Intellectual Property Organization (WIPO)
- World Meteorological Organization (WMO)
- Taipei Computer Association (TCA)
- UC Berkeley
- Unicode Consortium
- W3C

== Member countries ==
Countries pay a fee to ISO to be members of subcommittees.

The 24 "P" (participating) members of ISO/IEC JTC 1/SC 2 are: Canada, China, Czech Republic, Finland, France, Germany, Greece, Hungary, India, Indonesia, Ireland, Japan, Kazakhstan, Republic of Korea, Mongolia, Norway, Poland, Russian Federation, Serbia, Sri Lanka, Ukraine, United Kingdom, United States, and Viet Nam.

The 26 "O" (observing) members of ISO/IEC JTC 1/SC 2 are: Armenia, Austria, Belgium, Bosnia and Herzegovina, Cuba, Egypt, Ghana, Hong Kong, Iceland, Islamic Republic of Iran, Israel, Italy, Democratic People's Republic of Korea, Lithuania, Malaysia, Mexico, Morocco, Netherlands, Pakistan, Romania, Saudi Arabia, Slovenia, Switzerland, Thailand, Tunisia, and Turkey.

P-members are obliged to respond to ballots on standards developed by SC 2 (although they can enter an "abstain" response to a ballot if they choose to do so). O-members may comment on ballots, but are not allowed to vote.

== Published standards ==
ISO/IEC JTC 1/SC 2 has responsibility for 49 published ISO/IEC standards within the field of coded character sets, including:

ISO/IEC Standard	Title	Status	Description	WG/OWG
ISO/IEC 646	Information technology – ISO 7-bit coded character set for information interchange	Published (1991)	Specifies a set of basic graphic characters and their coded representations through the use of a 7-bit character code	3 (disbanded)
ISO/IEC 2022	Information technology – Character code structure and extension techniques	Published (1994)	Specifies: a technique for including multiple character sets in a single character encoding system, and; a technique for representing these character sets in both 7 and 8 bit systems using the same encoding	3 (disbanded)
ISO/IEC 6429	Information technology – Control functions for coded character sets	Published (1992)	“Includes control functions and their coded representations for a 7-bit code, an extended 7-bit code, an 8-bit code or an extended 8-bit code”	3 (disbanded)
ISO/IEC 8859-1	Information technology – 8-bit single-byte coded graphic character sets – Part 1: Latin alphabet No. 1	Published (1998)	Specifies a set of up to 191 graphic characters and their coded representations through the use of a single 8-bit byte	3 (disbanded)
ISO/IEC 10646	Information technology – Universal Coded Character Set (UCS)	Published (2014)	Specifies the Universal Character Set (UCS), and is applicable to the representation, transmission, interchange, processing, storage, input, and presentation of the written form of the languages of the world, as well as additional symbols	2
ISO/IEC 14651	Information technology – International string ordering and comparison – Method for comparing character strings and description of the common template tailorable ordering	Published (2016)	Defines: A reference comparison method; A Common Template Table; A reference name; Requirements for the declaration of the differences between the collation table and the Common Template Table	OWG-SORT (disbanded)

Standards under development within ISO/IEC JTC 1/SC 2 include amendments to the ISO/IEC 10646 standard (covered by ISO/IEC JTC 1/SC 2/WG 2) and amendments to the ISO/IEC 14651 standard (covered directly by ISO/IEC JTC 1/SC 2 rather than in a WG).

== See also ==
- International Electrotechnical Commission – International standards organization
- International Organization for Standardization – International standards development organization
- ISO/IEC JTC 1 – Joint technical committee of the ISO and IEC
- Japanese Industrial Standards Committee – Standards organization in Japan
- List of ISO standards
- Unicode – Character encoding standard
- Unicode Consortium – Nonprofit organization that coordinates the development of the Unicode Standard
