= Xpdf =

Open-source PDF viewer software

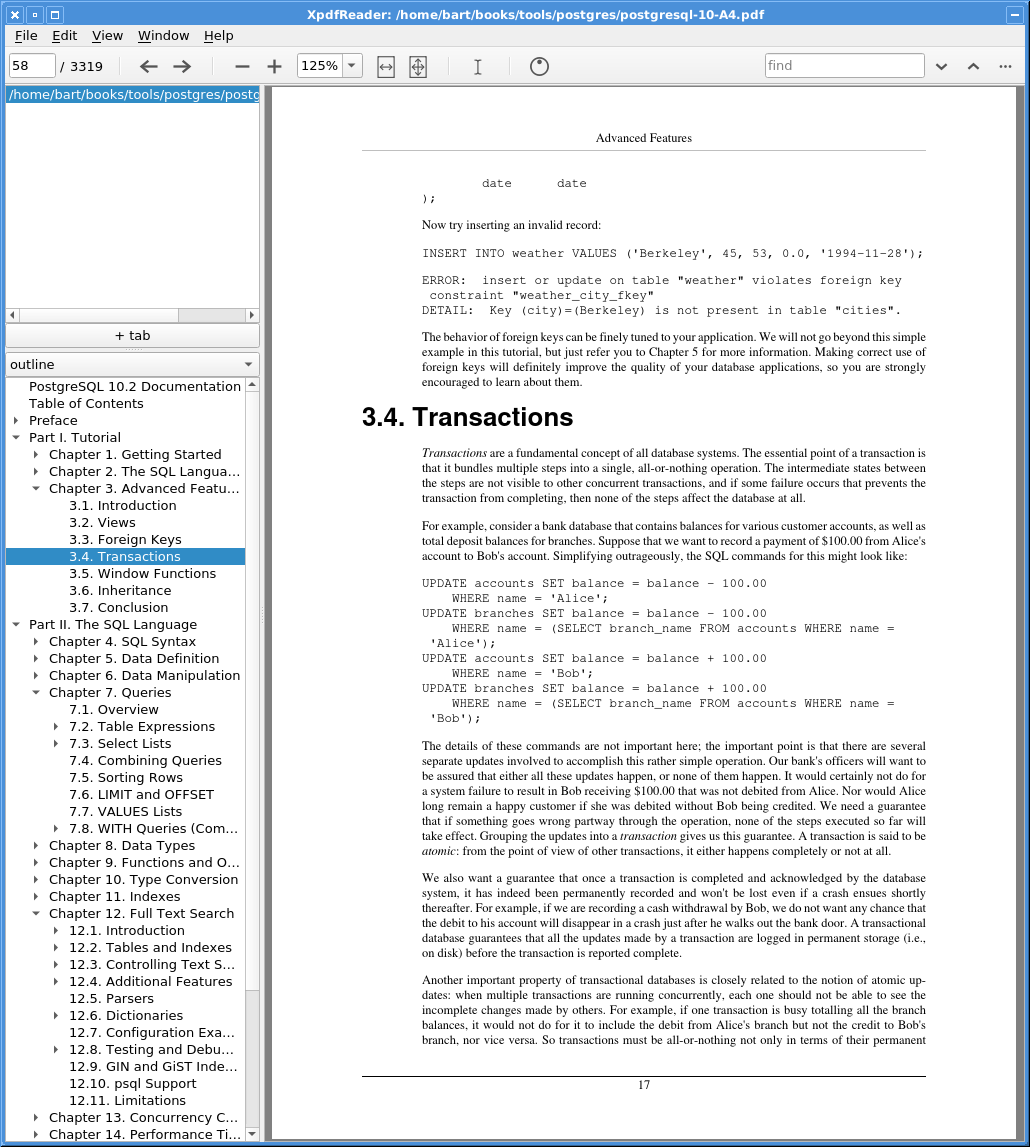
- XpdfReader 4.0 screenshot
- Developers: Glyph & Cog
- Initial release: December 12, 1995; 29 years ago
- Stable release: 4.05 / 8 February 2024
- Operating system: Linux, Windows, macOS, FreeBSD, OpenVMS
- Type: PDF viewer
- License: GPL-2.0-only or GPL-3.0-only or proprietary
- Website: xpdfreader.com

Xpdf is a free and open-source PDF viewer and toolkit based on the Qt framework. Versions prior to 4.00 were written for the X Window System and Motif.

== Functions ==
Xpdf runs on nearly any Unix-like operating system. Binaries are also available for Windows. Xpdf can decode LZW and read encrypted PDFs. The official version obeys the DRM restrictions of PDF files, which can prevent copying, printing, or converting some PDF files. There are patches that make Xpdf ignore these DRM restrictions; the Debian distribution, for example, has these patches in place by default.

Xpdf includes several programs that don't need an X Window System, including some that extract images from PDF files or convert PDF to PostScript or text. These programs run on DOS, Windows, Linux and Unix.

Xpdf is also used as a back-end for other PDF readers frontends such as KPDF and GPDF, and its engine, without the X11 display components, is used for PDF viewers including BePDF on BeOS, '!PDF' on RISC OS, and PalmPDF on Palm OS and on Windows Mobile.

Two versions exist for AmigaOS. Xpdf needs a limited version of an X11 engine called Cygnix on the host system. AmigaOS 4 included AmiPDF, a PDF viewer based on 3.01 version of the Xpdf. However both Apdf and AmiPDF are native and need no X11.

== xpdf-utils ==
The associated package "xpdf-utils" or "poppler-utils" contains tools such as pdftotext and pdfimages.

== Exploit ==
A vulnerability in the Xpdf implementation of the JBIG2 file format, re-used in Apple's iOS phone operating software, was used by the Pegasus spyware to implement a zero-click attack on iPhones by constructing an emulated computer architecture inside a JBIG2 stream. Apple fixed this "FORCEDENTRY" vulnerability in iOS 14.8 in September 2021.

== See also ==
- Poppler, a GPL-licensed fork of the xpdf-3.0 rendering library designed for easier reuse in other programs
- List of PDF software

== Sources ==
- Steward, Sid (16 August 2004). PDF Hacks: 100 Industrial-Strength Tips & Tools. O'Reilly. ISBN 0-596-00655-1.
