= Idoia =

Idoia is a Spanish feminine given name. People with the name include:

- Idoia Estornés Zubizarreta (born 1940), Chilean-born Spanish historian and writer
- Idoia López Riaño, former ETA assassin
- Idoia Mendia (born 1965), Spanish politician
- Idoia Ochoa (born 1985), electrical engineer.
- Idoia Otaegui (born 1968), Basque lawyer, jurist, politician and university teacher
- Idoia Villanueva (born 1980), Spanish politician and engineer
