= MP3 (disambiguation) =

MP3, formally MPEG-1 Audio Layer III or MPEG-2 Audio Layer III, is a digital audio format.

MP3 may also refer to:

== Media ==
- Mario Party 3, a third and final Mario Party game for the Nintendo 64
- Max Payne 3, a third-person shooter game developed by Rockstar Games for the PlayStation 3 and Xbox 360
- .MP3 (album), 2023 album by Emilia
- MP3: Mera Pehla Pehla Pyaar, a 2007 Indian film
- MP3 (Marcy Playground album), 2004
- MP3 (M. Pokora album), 2008
- "MP3", the first track on the 2014 album Simplicity by Tesla
- MP3, a program on Dropout

== Other uses ==
- MP3.com, an online music downloads website
- Mazda MP3, or Mazda Familia, a car
- Piaggio MP3, a three-wheeled motorized vehicle
- Møller–Plesset perturbation of order three

== See also ==
- MPEG-3, a group of audio and video coding standards
