= JISC =

JISC may refer to:

- Jisc, formerly known as Joint Information Systems Committee, the UK body concerned with information and communications technology in education
- Japanese Industrial Standards Committee
