= Joint Photographic Experts Group =

Standard organisation for image formats

- ISO/IEC JTC 1/SC 29/WG 1
- Logo of the Joint Photographic Experts Group
- Abbreviation: JPEG
- Status: Active
- Year started: 1986
- Organization: ISO / IEC
- Committee: JTC 1/SC 29/WG 1
- Related standards: JPEG (ISO/IEC 10918); JPEG 2000 (ISO/IEC 15444); JPEG XR (ISO/IEC 29199); JPEG XL (ISO/IEC 18181)
- Domain: Digital image coding standards
- Website: jpeg.org

The Joint Photographic Experts Group (JPEG) is an international standards committee that created and maintains widely used digital image compression formats. The committee is a collaborative working group of the International Organization for Standardization (ISO) and the International Electrotechnical Commission (IEC). The committee created and maintains the JPEG, JPEG 2000, JPEG XR, JPEG XT, JPEG XS, JPEG XL, and related digital image standards. It also has the responsibility for maintenance of the JBIG and JBIG2 standards that were developed by the former Joint Bi-level Image Experts Group.

Within ISO/IEC JTC 1, JPEG is Working Group 1 (WG 1) of Subcommittee 29 (SC 29) and has the formal title JPEG Coding of digital representations of images, where it is one of eight working groups in SC 29. In the ITU-T (formerly called the CCITT), its work falls in the domain of the ITU-T Visual Coding Experts Group (VCEG), which is Question 6 of Study Group 16.

JPEG has typically held meetings three or four times annually in North America, Asia and Europe. The chairman of JPEG (termed its Convenor in ISO/IEC terminology) is Prof. Touradj Ebrahimi of École Polytechnique Fédérale de Lausanne, who previously had led JPEG 2000 development within the JPEG committee and also had a leading role in MPEG-4 standardization.

== History ==
In April 1983, ISO started to work to add photo quality graphics to text terminals. In the mid-1980s, both the CCITT (now ITU-T) and ISO had standardization groups for image coding: CCITT Study Group VIII (SG8) – Telematic Services and ISO TC97 SC2 WG8 – Coding of Audio and Picture Information. They were historically targeted on image communication. The JPEG committee was created in 1986 and the Joint (CCITT/ISO) Bi-level Image Group (JBIG) was created in 1988.

Former chairs of JPEG include Greg Wallace of Digital Equipment Corporation and Daniel Lee of Yahoo. Fumitaka Ono of Tokyo Polytechnic University was chair of the former JBIG group that has since been merged into JPEG.

== Standards published and under development ==
JPEG (Joint Photographic Experts Group) is Working Group 1 of ISO/IEC JTC 1/SC 29, titled JPEG Coding of digital representations of images (working as a joint team with ITU-T SG 16). It has developed various standards, which have been published by ITU-T and/or ISO/IEC. The standards developed by the JPEG (and former JBIG) sub-groups are referred to as a joint development of ISO/IEC JTC 1/SC 29/WG 1 and ITU-T SG16. The JPEG standards typically consist of different Parts in ISO/IEC terminology. Each Part is a separate document that covers a certain aspect of a suite of standards that share a project number, and the Parts can be adopted separately as individual standards or used together. For the JPEG standards that are published jointly with ITU-T, each ISO/IEC Part corresponds to a separate ITU-T Recommendation (i.e., a separate standard). Once published, JPEG standards have also often been revised by later amendments and/or new editions – e.g., to add optional extended capabilities or improve the editorial quality of the specifications. Standards developed and under development by JPEG are shown in the table below.

Joint Photographic Experts Group – standards published and under development
Common name	Part	First edition	ISO/IEC number	ITU number	Formal title
JPEG	Part 1	1992	ISO/IEC 10918-1	ITU-T Rec. T.81	Information technology – Digital compression and coding of continuous-tone still images – Requirements and guidelines
JPEG	Part 2	1994	ISO/IEC 10918-2	ITU-T Rec. T.83	Information technology – Digital compression and coding of continuous-tone still images – Compliance testing
JPEG	Part 3	1996	ISO/IEC 10918-3	ITU-T Rec. T.84	Information technology – Digital compression and coding of continuous-tone still images: Extensions
JPEG	Part 4	1998	ISO/IEC 10918-4	ITU-T Rec. T.86	Information technology – Digital compression and coding of continuous-tone still images: Registration of JPEG profiles, SPIFF profiles, SPIFF tags, SPIFF colour spaces, APPn markers, SPIFF compression types and Registration Authorities (REGAUT)
JPEG	Part 5	2013	ISO/IEC 10918-5	ITU-T Rec. T.871	Information technology – Digital compression and coding of continuous-tone still images: JPEG File Interchange Format (JFIF)
JPEG	Part 6	2013	ISO/IEC 10918-6	ITU-T Rec. T.872	Information technology – Digital compression and coding of continuous-tone still images: Application to printing systems
JPEG	Part 7	2019	ISO/IEC 10918-7	ITU-T Rec. T.873	Information technology – Digital compression and coding of continuous-tone still images: Reference software
JPEG-LS	Part 1	1998	ISO/IEC 14495-1	ITU-T Rec. T.87	Information technology – Lossless and near-lossless compression of continuous-tone still images: Baseline
JPEG-LS	Part 2	2002	ISO/IEC 14495-2	ITU-T Rec. T.870	Information technology – Lossless and near-lossless compression of continuous-tone still images: Extensions
JPEG 2000	Part 1	2000	ISO/IEC 15444-1	ITU-T Rec. T.800	Information technology – JPEG 2000 image coding system – Core coding system
JPEG 2000	Part 2	2004	ISO/IEC 15444-2	ITU-T Rec. T.801	Information technology – JPEG 2000 image coding system: Extensions
JPEG 2000	Part 3	2002	ISO/IEC 15444-3	ITU-T Rec. T.802	Information technology – JPEG 2000 image coding system: Motion JPEG 2000
JPEG 2000	Part 4	2002	ISO/IEC 15444-4	ITU-T Rec. T.803	Information technology – JPEG 2000 image coding system: Conformance testing
JPEG 2000	Part 5	2003	ISO/IEC 15444-5	ITU-T Rec. T.804	Information technology – JPEG 2000 image coding system: Reference software
JPEG 2000	Part 6	2003	ISO/IEC 15444-6	ITU-T Rec. T.805	Information technology – JPEG 2000 image coding system: Compound image file format
JPEG 2000	Part 8	2007	ISO/IEC 15444-8	ITU-T Rec. T.807	Information technology – JPEG 2000 image coding system: Secure JPEG 2000
JPEG 2000	Part 9	2005	ISO/IEC 15444-9	ITU-T Rec. T.808	Information technology – JPEG 2000 image coding system: Interactivity tools, APIs and protocols
JPEG 2000	Part 10	2008	ISO/IEC 15444-10	ITU-T Rec. T.809	Information technology –JPEG 2000 image coding system: Extensions for three-dimensional data
JPEG 2000	Part 11	2007	ISO/IEC 15444-11	ITU-T Rec. T.810	Information technology – JPEG 2000 image coding system: Wireless
JPEG 2000	Part 12	2004	ISO/IEC 15444-12		Information technology – JPEG 2000 image coding system – Part 12: ISO base media file format
JPEG 2000	Part 13	2008	ISO/IEC 15444-13	ITU-T Rec. T.812	Information technology – JPEG 2000 image coding system: An entry-level JPEG 2000 encoder
JPEG 2000	Part 14	2013	ISO/IEC 15444-14	ITU-T Rec. T.813	Information technology – JPEG 2000 image coding system: XML structural representation and reference
MRC		1999	ISO/IEC 16485	ITU-T Rec. T.44	Information technology – Mixed Raster Content (MRC)
JPSearch	Part 1	2007	ISO/IEC TR 24800-1		Information technology – JPSearch – Part 1: System framework and components
JPSearch	Part 2	2011	ISO/IEC 24800-2		Information technology – JPSearch – Part 2: Registration, identification and management of schema and ontology
JPSearch	Part 3	2010	ISO/IEC 24800-3		Information technology – JPSearch – Part 3: Query format
JPSearch	Part 4	2010	ISO/IEC 24800-4		Information technology – JPSearch – Part 4: File format for metadata embedded in image data (JPEG and JPEG 2000)
JPSearch	Part 5	2011	ISO/IEC 24800-5		Information technology – JPSearch – Part 5: Data interchange format between image repositories
JPSearch	Part 6	2012	ISO/IEC 24800-6		Information technology – JPSearch – Part 6: Reference software
JPEG XR	Part 1	2011	ISO/IEC TR 29199-1	T.Sup2	Information technology – JPEG XR image coding system – Part 1: System architecture
JPEG XR	Part 2	2009	ISO/IEC 29199-2	ITU-T Rec. T.832	Information technology – JPEG XR image coding system – Part 2: Image coding specification
JPEG XR	Part 3	2010	ISO/IEC 29199-3	ITU-T Rec. T.833	Information technology – JPEG XR image coding system – Part 3: Motion JPEG XR
JPEG XR	Part 4	2010	ISO/IEC 29199-4	ITU-T Rec. T.834	Information technology – JPEG XR image coding system – Part 4: Conformance testing
JPEG XR	Part 5	2010	ISO/IEC 29199-5	ITU-T Rec. T.835	Information technology – JPEG XR image coding system – Part 5: Reference software
AIC	Part 1	2017	ISO/IEC TR 29170-1		Information technology – Advanced image coding and evaluation methodologies – Part 1: Guidelines for codec evaluation
AIC	Part 2	2015	ISO/IEC 29170-2		Information technology – Advanced image coding and evaluation – Part 2: Evaluation procedure for nearly lossless coding
JPEG XT	Part 1	2015	ISO/IEC 18477-1		Information technology – Scalable Compression and Coding of Continuous-Tone Still Images – Part 1: Core Coding System Specification
JPEG XT	Part 2	2016	ISO/IEC 18477-2		Information technology – Scalable Compression and Coding of Continuous-Tone Still Images – Part 2: Coding of High Dynamic Range Images
JPEG XT	Part 3	2015	ISO/IEC 18477-3		Information technology – Scalable Compression and Coding of Continuous-Tone Still Images – Part 3: Box file format
JPEG XT	Part 4	2017	ISO/IEC 18477-4		Information technology – Scalable Compression and Coding of Continuous-Tone Still Images – Part 4: Conformance Testing
JPEG XT	Part 5	2018	ISO/IEC 18477-5		Information technology – Scalable Compression and Coding of Continuous-Tone Still Images – Part 5: Reference software
JPEG XT	Part 6	2016	ISO/IEC 18477-6		Information technology – Scalable Compression and Coding of Continuous-Tone Still Images – Part 6: IDR Integer coding
JPEG XT	Part 7	2017	ISO/IEC 18477-7		Information technology – Scalable Compression and Coding of Continuous-Tone Still Images – Part 7: HDR Floating-Point Coding
JPEG XT	Part 8	2016	ISO/IEC 18477-8		Information technology – Scalable Compression and Coding of Continuous-Tone Still Images – Part 8: Lossless and Near-lossless Coding
JPEG XT	Part 9	2016	ISO/IEC 18477-9		Information technology – Scalable Compression and Coding of Continuous-Tone Still Images – Part 9: Alpha channel coding
JPEG XS	Part 1	2019	ISO/IEC 21122-1		Information technology – JPEG XS low-latency lightweight image coding system – Part 1: Core coding system
JPEG XS	Part 2	2019	ISO/IEC 21122-2		Information technology – JPEG XS low-latency lightweight image coding system – Part 2: Profiles and buffer models
JPEG XS	Part 3	2019	ISO/IEC 21122-3		Information technology – JPEG XS low-latency lightweight image coding system – Part 3: Transport and container formats
JPEG XS	Part 4	2020	ISO/IEC 21122-4		Information technology – JPEG XS low-latency lightweight image coding system – Part 4: Conformance testing
JPEG XS	Part 5	2020	ISO/IEC 21122-5		Information technology – JPEG XS low-latency lightweight image coding system – Part 5: Reference software
JPEG XL	Part 1	2022	ISO/IEC 18181-1		Information technology – JPEG XL Image Coding System – Part 1: Core coding system
JPEG XL	Part 2	2021	ISO/IEC 18181-2		Information technology – JPEG XL Image Coding System – Part 2: File format
JPEG XL	Part 3	2022	ISO/IEC 18181-3		Information technology – JPEG XL Image Coding System – Part 3: Conformance testing
JPEG XL	Part 4	2022	ISO/IEC 18181-4		Information technology — JPEG XL Image Coding System — Part 4: Reference software
JPEG Pleno	Part 1	2020	ISO/IEC 21794-1		Information technology – Plenoptic image coding system (JPEG Pleno) – Part 1: Framework
JPEG Pleno	Part 2	2021	ISO/IEC 21794-2		Information technology – Plenoptic image coding system (JPEG Pleno) – Part 2: Light field coding
JPEG Pleno	Part 3	2021	ISO/IEC 21794-3		Information technology — Plenoptic image coding system (JPEG Pleno) – Part 3: Conformance testing
JPEG Pleno	Part 4	2022	ISO/IEC 21794-4		Information technology – Plenoptic image coding system (JPEG Pleno) – Part 4: Reference software
JPEG Pleno	Part 5	2024	ISO/IEC 21794-5		Information technology – Plenoptic image coding system (JPEG Pleno) – Part 5: Holography
JPEG Pleno	Part 6	Under development	ISO/IEC DIS 21794-6		Information technology – Plenoptic image coding system (JPEG Pleno) – Part 6: Learning-based point cloud coding
JPEG AI	Part 1	Under development	ISO/IEC DIS 6048-1		Information technology – JPEG AI learning-based image coding system – Part 1: Core coding system
JPEG AI	Part 2	Under development	ISO/IEC CD 6048-2		Information technology – JPEG AI learning-based image coding system – Part 2: Profiling
JPEG AI	Part 3	Under development	ISO/IEC CD 6048-3		Information technology – JPEG AI learning-based image coding system – Part 3: Reference software
JPEG AI	Part 4	Under development	ISO/IEC CD 6048-4		Information technology – JPEG AI learning-based image coding system – Part 4: Conformance
JPEG AI	Part 5	Under development	ISO/IEC CD 6048-5		Information technology – JPEG AI learning-based image coding system – Part 5: File Format
JPEG Trust	Part 1	Under development	ISO/IEC PRF 21617-1		Information technology – JPEG Trust – Part 1: Core foundation
JPEG Trust	Part 2	Under development	ISO/IEC AWI 21617-2		Information technology – JPEG Trust – Part 2: Trust profiles catalogue
JPEG Trust	Part 3	Under development	ISO/IEC AWI 21617-3		Information technology – JPEG Trust – Part 3: Media asset watermarking

== See also ==
- Moving Picture Experts Group (MPEG)
- Joint Bi-level Image Experts Group (JBIG)
