= MPEG-A =

Set of standards for multimedia applications

MPEG-A is a group of standards for composing MPEG systems formally known as ISO/IEC 23000 - Multimedia Application Format, published since 2007.

MPEG-A consists of 20 parts, including:

- MPEG-A Part 1: Purpose for multimedia application formats
- MPEG-A Part 2: MPEG music player application format
- MPEG-A Part 3: MPEG photo player application format
- MPEG-A Part 4: Musical slide show application format
- MPEG-A Part 5: Media streaming application format
- MPEG-A Part 6: Professional archival application format
- MPEG-A Part 7: Open access application format
- MPEG-A Part 8: Portable video application format
- MPEG-A Part 9: Digital Multimedia Broadcasting application format
- MPEG-A Part 10: Surveillance application format
- MPEG-A Part 11: Stereoscopic video application format
- MPEG-A Part 12: Interactive music application format
- MPEG-A Part 13: Augmented reality application format
- MPEG-A Part 15: Multimedia preservation application format
- MPEG-A Part 16: Publish/Subscribe Application Format
- MPEG-A Part 17: Multiple sensorial media application format
- MPEG-A Part 18: Media linking application format
- MPEG-A Part 19: Common media application format (CMAF) for segmented media (MPEG CMAF), – a media application format for ABR (adaptive bitrate) media

== See also ==
- ISO/IEC JTC 1/SC 29
