= Pdfimages =

Command-line software

pdfimages is an open-source command-line utility for lossless extraction of images from PDF files. pdfimages can extract images embedded within PDFs as PPM/PBM, PNG, TIFF, JPEG, JPEG2000, and JBIG2 files and can convert and output images to any of the formats it can extract. It is freely available as part of poppler-utils and xpdf-utils, and included in many Linux distributions.

pdfimages originates from the xpdf package (but now part of poppler-utils). The Poppler software package, which is derived from xpdf, also includes an implementation of pdfimages.

== See also ==
- List of PDF software
