= Quadream =

Israeli surveillance technology company

- Company type: Private
- Industry: Surveillance technology
- Founded: 2014
- Founders: Guy Geva; Nimrod Reznik
- Headquarters: Ramat Gan, Israel
- Area served: Worldwide
- Products: Spyware; mobile device exploitation tools

Quadream was an Israeli surveillance technology company. It prominently sold iPhone hacking tools, and was founded in 2014 by a group including two former NSO Group employees, Guy Geva, and Nimrod Reznik. Its offices were in Ramat Gan. The company is suspected to have shut down in April 2023. It is owned by a parent company in Cyprus.

Quadream is believed to have developed "zero-click" exploit tools similar to those used by NSO Group. Its customers include the government of Saudi Arabia. In at least 10 countries and continents North America and Europe, governments used tools developed by Quadream against journalists and opposition.

Shortly before shutting down, Citizen Lab released a report detailing the use of Quadream's spyware against members of civil society including journalists, an NGO worker, and political opposition figures. It is alleged that this report, as well as Israeli regulations and a lack of sales, were the reasons behind the company's closure.

== See also ==
- Pegasus (spyware), developed by NSO Group
