= Leonardo Chiariglione =

Italian engineer and inventor

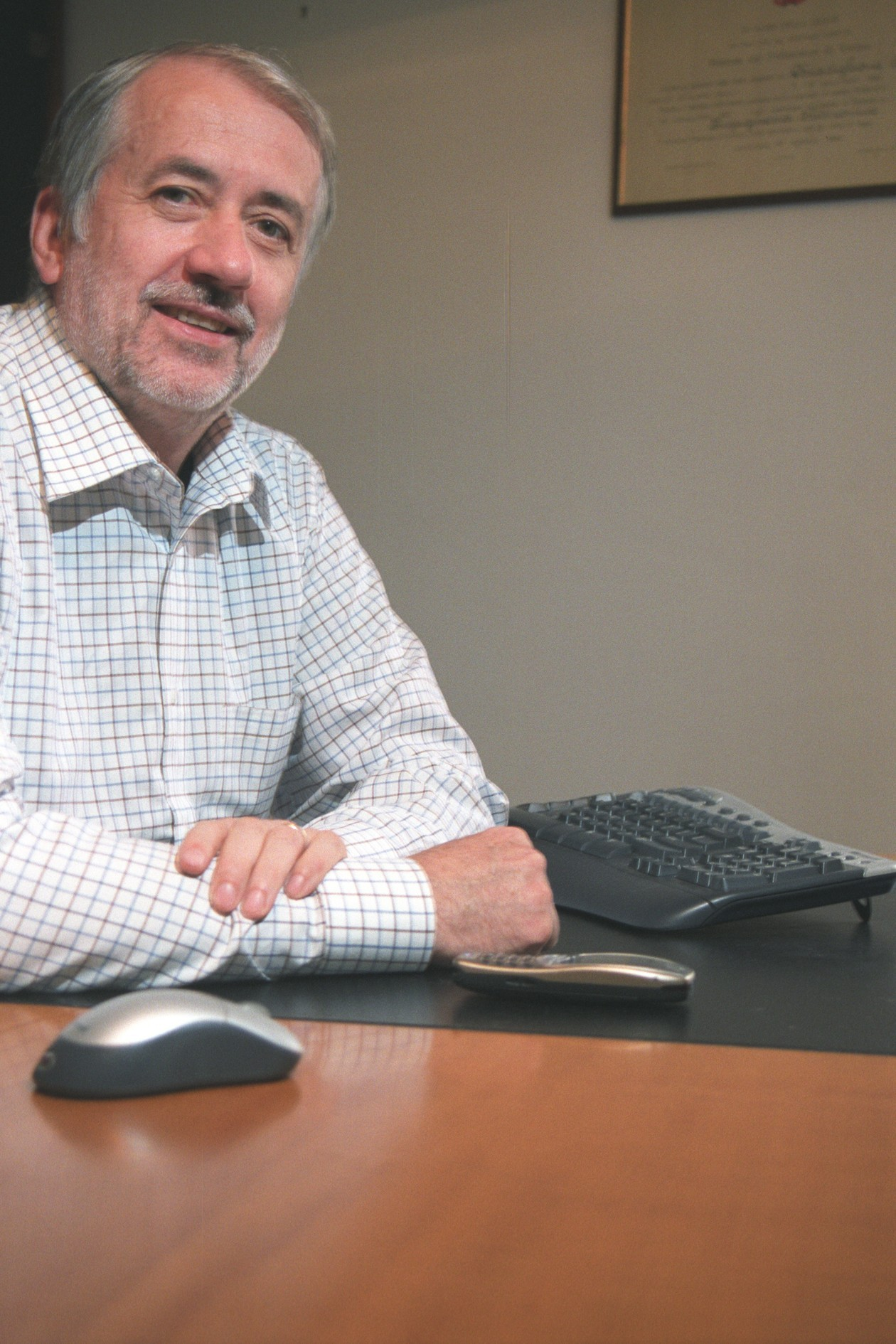
Leonardo Chiariglione in 2011

Leonardo Chiariglione (IPA: [kjariʎˈʎoːne]) (born 30 January 1943 in Almese, Turin province, Piedmont, Italy) is an Italian engineer who has led the development of international technical standards for digital media. In particular, he was the chairman of the Moving Picture Experts Group (MPEG) from 1988 to 2020, which he co-founded together with Hiroshi Yasuda of NTT.

== Biography ==
After receiving a classical high school education at the Liceo Salesiano Valsalice in Turin, he earned a master's degree in electronic engineering at the Polytechnic University of Turin in 1967, then obtained a Ph.D. degree at the University of Tokyo in 1973, where he also learned to speak Japanese. Chiariglione speaks five languages, including English and French.

From March 1971 until July 2003, he was with CSELT, the corporate research center of the Telecom Italia group. His final position there was vice president, multimedia, at Telecom Italia Lab, the new name given to CSELT in 2001.

The initiative for which he is best known started in 1988, when he originated the ISO/IEC standardization activity known as MPEG (or Moving Picture Experts Group) (originally ISO TC 97/SC 2/WG 8, later ISO/IEC JTC 1 SC 29/WG 11), of which he was the Convenor (chairman) from its start until June 2020. This group, with a membership of over 300 experts, representing 20 countries and various industries having a stake in digital audio and video, produced the MPEG-1 and MPEG-2 standards that facilitated the emergence of digital audio-visual media.

He has led a number of European collaborative projects:

- IVICO – a RACE project investigating cost-effective integrated video codecs
- COMIS – an ESPRIT project supporting the development of the MPEG-1 standard
- EU 625 VADIS – a EUREKA project aiming at developing a European hardware and software technology for the MPEG-2 standard

He also initiated other efforts to define internationally agreed technical specifications, such as DAVIC (the Digital Audio-Visual Council) in 1994 and FIPA (the Foundation for Intelligent Physical Agents) in 1996.

In 1999, he became the Executive Director of SDMI (the Secure Digital Music Initiative), a forum comprising hundreds of companies with the goal to develop specifications for an open standard for secure digital music delivery technology. He stepped down from this post in 2001, having expressed frustration about conflicts between the members of the group, which had failed to produce effective anti-piracy specifications.

He is currently CEO of cedeo.net.

== Awards and honors ==
Chiariglione has received the IBC John Tucker Award (1999), IEEE Masaru Ibuka Consumer Electronics Award (1999), Kilby International Award (1998), and IET Faraday Medal (2012).

He was appointed as Distinguished Invited Professor at Information and Communication University, Daejeon, Korea, in 2004.

Chiariglione was given Honorary Membership of the Society of Motion Picture and Television Engineers (SMPTE) in October 2014.

Chiariglione was also awarded with Charles F. Jenkins lifetime achievement award (a Primetime Engineering Emmy Award) in recognition of his 30 years of work as co-founder and chairman of MPEG and leading it in setting the worldwide standards for digital video compression and transmission. In a blog post, while thanking for this recognition award he also highlighted some big issues that he said needed to be addressed in the future.
