= FORCEDENTRY =

Computer security exploit

CVE-2021-30860
- CVSS 3.x score: 7.8
- CVSS 3.x vector: CVSS:3.1/AV:L/AC:L/PR:N/UI:R/S:U/C:H/I:H/A:H

CVE-2021-30858
- CVSS 3.x score: 8.8
- CVSS 3.x vector: CVSS:3.1/AV:N/AC:L/PR:N/UI:R/S:U/C:H/I:H/A:H
- Date patched: September 2021
- Discoverer: Bill Marczak from Citizen Lab
- Affected software: Apple CoreGraphics (Quartz); iOS (prior to v14.8); macOS (prior to macOS Big Sur 11.6, Security Update 2021-005 Catalina); watchOS (prior to v7.6.2)

FORCEDENTRY, also capitalized as ForcedEntry, is a security exploit allegedly developed by NSO Group to deploy their Pegasus spyware. Reuters reported that Quadream also used the exploit. It enables the "zero-click" exploit that is prevalent in iOS 13 and below, but also compromises recent safeguards set by Apple's "BlastDoor" in iOS 14 and later. In September 2021, Apple released new versions of its operating systems for multiple device families containing a fix for the vulnerability.

== Exploit ==
The exploit was discovered by Citizen Lab, who reported that the vulnerability has been used to target political dissidents and human rights activists. FORCEDENTRY appears to be the same as the attack previously detected and named "Megalodon" by Amnesty International.

The exploit uses PDF files disguised as GIF files to inject JBIG2-encoded data to provoke an integer overflow in Apple's CoreGraphics system, circumventing Apple's "BlastDoor" sandbox for message content. BlastDoor was introduced as part of iOS 14 to defend against KISMET, another zero-click exploit. The FORCEDENTRY exploit has been given the CVE identifier CVE-2021-30860. In December 2021, Google's Project Zero team published a technical breakdown of the exploit based on its collaboration with Apple's Security Engineering and Architecture (SEAR) group.

The exploit was described by Project Zero team:

JBIG2 doesn't have scripting capabilities, but when combined with a vulnerability, it does have the ability to emulate circuits of arbitrary logic gates operating on arbitrary memory. So why not just use that to build your own computer architecture and script that!? That's exactly what this exploit does. Using over 70,000 segment commands defining logical bit operations, they define a small computer architecture with features such as registers and a full 64-bit adder and comparator which they use to search memory and perform arithmetic operations. It's not as fast as Javascript, but it's fundamentally computationally equivalent. The bootstrapping operations for the sandbox escape exploit are written to run on this logic circuit and the whole thing runs in this weird, emulated environment created out of a single decompression pass through a JBIG2 stream. It's pretty incredible, and at the same time, pretty terrifying.

According to Citizen Lab, the FORCEDENTRY vulnerability exists in iOS versions prior to 14.8, macOS versions prior to macOS Big Sur 11.6 and Security Update 2021-005 Catalina, and watchOS versions prior to 7.6.2.

== Apple lawsuit ==
In November 2021, Apple Inc. filed a complaint against NSO Group and its parent company Q Cyber Technologies in the United States District Court for the Northern District of California in relation to FORCEDENTRY, requesting injunctive relief, compensatory damages, punitive damages, and disgorgement of profits but in 2024 asked the court to dismiss the lawsuit.

== See also ==
- iMessage
