= Hiroshi Yasuda =

Japanese engineer

Hiroshi Yasuda (born 1944) is an Emeritus Professor at the University of Tokyo and works as a Consultant for Nippon Telegraph and Telephone.

In the sphere of international standardization, together with Leonardo Chiariglione he founded the Moving Picture Experts Group which standardized MPEG-1 Audio Layer 3, better known as MP3.

Prof. Hiroshi Yasuda received his B.E., M.E. and Dr.E. degrees from the University of Tokyo, Japan in 1967, 1969, and 1972 respectively. Thereafter, he joined the Electrical Communication Laboratories of NTT in 1972 where he has been involved in works on Video Coding, Facsimile Network, Image Processing, Telepresence, B-ISDN Network and Services, Internet and Computer Communication Applications. He worked four years (1988–1992) as the Executive Manager of Visual Media Lab. of NTT Human Interface Labs., and served three years (1992–1995) as the Executive Manager of System Services Department of NTT Business Communications Systems Headquarters and became vice president, Director of NTT Information and Communication Systems Laboratories at Yokosuka since July 1995. After serving twenty-five years for NTT (1972–1997) he left NTT to work at The University of Tokyo. From 2003 until 2005 he was acting director of The Center for Collaborative Research (CCR) and is now a Professor at Tokyo Denki University. He is a member of the IT Strategic Headquarters (Japan).

Professor Yasuda also served as the International Organization for Standardization's chairperson of ISO/IEC JTC 1/SC 29 (JPEG/MPEG Standardization) from 1991 - 1999.

He has served as a guest editor of IEEE Journal on SAC several times, such as Vol.11, No.1. and has served as The Exhibition Chair of 1996 Multimedia Systems Conference sponsored by Computer Society. He also served as the president of DAVIC (Digital Audio Video Council) from 1996 -1998.

He has received numerous awards, including the Takayanagi Award in 1987, the Achievement Award of EICEJ in 1995, The EMMY from The National Academy of Television Arts and Science in 1995, the IEEE fellowship grade in 1998 for contributions to the international standardization activities on video coding technologies and the research and development of visual communications and multimedia communications systems, the Charles Proteus Steinmetz Award from IEEE in 2000, the Takayanagi Award in 2005 and The Medal with Purple Ribbon from The Emperor of Japan in 2009. He is a Life Fellow of IEEE, Fellow of EICEJ and IPSJ, and a member of Television Institute. He wrote International Standardization of Multimedia Coding in 1991, MPEG/International Standardization of Multimedia Coding in 1994, The Base for the Digital Image Coding in 1995, The Text for Internet in 1996, The Text for MPEG" in 2002 and The Text for Content Distribution in 2003.
