= Idoia Ochoa =

Spanish electrical engineer and academic (born 1985)

- Born: Idoia Ochoa Álvarez; 1985 (age 40–41); San Sebastián, Spain
- Education: University of Navarra; Stanford University
- Occupations: Electrical engineer; academic
- Employer: University of Navarra
- Known for: Genomic data compression

Idoia Ochoa Álvarez (born 1985) is a Spanish electrical engineer and academic whose research applies data compression and computational methods to genomic and other omics data; she is a professor at Tecnun, the engineering school of the University of Navarra. After studying at the University of Navarra and Stanford University, she worked at the University of Illinois Urbana-Champaign before returning to Tecnun; in 2019, MIT Technology Review included her in its Innovators Under 35 Europe list for her work on genomic data. Her later work includes Moss, a computational method for identifying single-nucleotide variants from multiple bulk DNA tumour samples.

== Early life and education ==
Ochoa is from San Sebastián and chose telecommunications engineering because its breadth included mathematics and computing; after graduating from Tecnun, she went to Stanford in 2010 on a la Caixa fellowship. She earned bachelor's and master's degrees in telecommunication engineering from the University of Navarra in 2009, followed by an MS in 2012 and a PhD in 2016 from Stanford's Department of Electrical Engineering. Her doctoral dissertation, Genomic Data Compression and Processing: Theory, Models, Algorithms, and Experiments, was supervised by Tsachy Weissman.

== Career ==
Ochoa joined the Department of Electrical and Computer Engineering at the University of Illinois Urbana-Champaign as an assistant professor in January 2017; she moved to Tecnun in January 2020 but retained an adjunct position at Illinois and continued supervising doctoral students there. At Tecnun, she joined the Department of Electrical and Electronic Engineering and continued her research on algorithms for genomic data. In 2023, she coordinated Tecnun's new degree in Computer Engineering and Artificial Intelligence, which was scheduled to begin in the 2024–25 academic year on the San Sebastián campus.

== Research ==
Her compression work includes QualComp, QVZ, GeneComp, AliCo, FaStore and SPRING; the last reduced one raw genomic dataset from 196 GB to 7 GB, and she also contributed to work on the ISO MPEG-G format for representing genomic information. The Chan Zuckerberg Initiative reported that SPRING reduced the size of compressed raw genomic data by a factor of three, ALICO improved compression of SAM/BAM files by 20 per cent over other tools at similar speeds, and GPress reduced gene-expression files by 98 per cent while preserving queries by identifier or coordinate range. Moss, described in a 2021 paper in Nature Communications, analyses multiple samples from a tumour together, can detect mutations present at very low frequencies and was released as open software for other researchers and clinicians.

== Awards ==
MIT Technology Review selected Ochoa for its 2019 Innovators Under 35 Europe list after a jury of 116 specialists evaluated more than 1,000 candidates, recognising her algorithms for processing genomic data. In 2020, she received a five-year Ramón y Cajal fellowship from Spain's Ministry of Science and Innovation and was selected for the Gipuzkoa Fellows programme, which supports the recruitment of researchers with international postdoctoral experience by centres in Gipuzkoa.
