= Poppler (software) =

PDF rendering engine

- Developer: freedesktop.org
- Release: 4 March 2005; 21 years ago (Note: This file-modification date appears on the version 0.1.1 tarball, the "first real release", according to Poppler's release history.)
- Stable release: 26.07.0 / 2 July 2026; 60 days ago
- Written in: C++
- Operating system: Linux, Unix, BSD, Windows
- Type: Library
- License: GPLv2 or GPLv3
- Website: poppler.freedesktop.org
- Repository: gitlab.freedesktop.org/poppler/poppler

Poppler is a free and open-source software library for rendering Portable Document Format (PDF) documents. Its development is supported by freedesktop.org. Commonly used on Linux systems, it powers the PDF viewers of the GNOME and KDE desktop environments.

== History ==
The project was started by Kristian Høgsberg with two goals: to provide PDF rendering functionality as a shared library, to centralize maintenance effort and to go beyond the goals of Xpdf, and to integrate with functionality provided by modern operating systems.

By the version 0.18 release in 2011, the poppler library represented a complete implementation of ISO 32000-1, the PDF format standard, and was the first major free PDF library to support its forms (only Acroforms but not full XFA forms) and annotations features.

Poppler is a fork of Xpdf-3.0, a PDF file viewer developed by Derek Noonburg of Glyph and Cog, LLC.

The name Poppler comes from "The Problem with Popplers," an episode of the animated series Futurama.

== Applications ==
Notable free software applications using Poppler to render PDF documents include:

Application	GUI widgets
Evince	GLib
GIMP	GTK
Inkscape	GTK
LibreOffice 4.x	GTK
Okular	Qt
pdftotext, pdftohtml, etc.	none
QPDF	Qt
TeXstudio	Qt
TeXworks	Qt
xpopple	Motif
Zathura	GTK

== Features ==
Poppler can use two back-ends for drawing PDF documents, Cairo and Splash. Its features may depend on which back-end it employs. A third back-end based on Qt4's painting framework "Arthur", is available, but is incomplete and no longer under active development. Bindings exist for Glib and Qt5, that provide interfaces to the Poppler backends, although the Qt5 bindings support only the Splash and Arthur backends. There is a patchset available to add support for the Cairo backend to the Qt5 bindings, but the Poppler project does not currently wish to integrate the feature into the library proper.

Some characteristics of the back-ends include:

- Cairo: Anti-aliasing of vector graphics, and transparent objects.
  - Cairo does not smooth bitmap images such as scanned documents.
  - Cairo does not depend on the X Window System, so Poppler can run on other platforms like Wayland, Windows or macOS.
- Splash: Supports minification filtering of bitmaps.

Poppler comes with a text-rendering back-end as well, which can be invoked from the command line utility pdftotext. It is useful for searching for strings in PDFs from the command line, using the utility grep, for instance.

Example:

pdftotext file.pdf - | grep string

Poppler partially supports annotations and Acroforms. It does not support JavaScript nor the rendering of full XFA forms.

== poppler-utils ==
poppler-utils is a collection of command-line utilities built on Poppler's library API, to manage PDF and extract contents:

- pdfattach – add a new embedded file (attachment) to an existing PDF
- pdfdetach – extract embedded documents from a PDF
- pdffonts – lists the fonts used in a PDF
- pdfimages – extract all embedded images at native resolution from a PDF
- pdfinfo – list all information of a PDF
- pdfseparate – extract single pages from a PDF
- pdftocairo – convert single pages from a PDF to vector or bitmap formats using cairo
- pdftohtml – convert PDF to HTML format retaining formatting
- pdftoppm – convert a PDF page to a bitmap
- pdftops – convert PDF to printable PS format
- pdftotext – extract all text from PDF
- pdfunite – merges several PDFs

== See also ==
- List of PDF software
- OpenPDF – another free and open-source PDF library
- MuPDF – a free and open-source rendering engine for PDF, XPS, and EPUB
