= ISO/IEC JTC 1/SC 29 =

ISO/IEC JTC 1/SC 29, entitled Coding of audio, picture, multimedia and hypermedia information, is a standardization subcommittee of the Joint Technical Committee ISO/IEC JTC 1 of the International Organization for Standardization (ISO) and the International Electrotechnical Commission (IEC). It develops and facilitates international standards, technical reports, and technical specifications within the field of audio, picture, multimedia, and hypermedia information coding. SC 29 includes the well-known JPEG and MPEG experts groups, and the importance of the standards developed by SC 29 have been recognized by at least 15 Emmy Awards.

The international secretariat of SC 29 is the Japanese Industrial Standards Committee (JISC) of Japan.

== History ==
ISO/IEC JTC 1/SC 29 was established in 1991, when the subcommittee took over the tasks of ISO/IEC JTC 1/SC 2/WG 8. Its title, "Coded representation of audio, picture, multimedia and hypermedia information", has not been changed since its inception. Within its first year, SC 29 established four working groups, a secretariat, and working group conveners, and held its first plenary in Tokyo, Japan. Its founding chair was Hiroshi Yasuda of NTT, who continued to serve in that capacity through 1999. Subsequent chairs have been Hiroshi Watanabe of NTT (2000–2006), Kohtaro Asai of Mitsubishi Electric (2007–2017), Teruhiko Suzuki of Sony (2018–2020), and Gary Sullivan of Dolby Labs (2021–present, originally from Microsoft before moving to Dolby in 2023).

In 2003, SC 29 was the inaugural recipient of the Lawrence D. Eicher Award, an award that has been given by ISO to only one technical committee or subcommittee each year, which "recognizes the significant contribution and superior performance of an ISO technical committee (TC) or subcommittee (SC) to the development of ISO International Standards".

As of May 2024, SC 29 is responsible for 617 currently published standards and updates of standards, including standards for JPEG (ISO/IEC 10918-1), JPEG-2000 (ISO/IEC 15444-1), MPEG-1 (ISO/IEC 11172-1), MPEG-2 (ISO/IEC 13818), MPEG-4 (ISO/IEC 14996), MPEG-4 AVC (ISO/IEC 14496-10), JBIG (ISO/IEC 11544), MHEG-5 (ISO/IEC 13522-5), etc.

== Emmy Award recognitions ==
ISO/IEC JTC 1/SC 29 has received ten Emmy Awards in recognition of the standards it has developed.

- In 1996, when the JPEG, MPEG-1, and MPEG-2 standards became widely recognized for their technological advancements, SC 29 was awarded a 1995–1996 Technology and Engineering Emmy Award for Outstanding Achievement in Technical/Engineering Development.
- The MPEG-4 AVC video coding standard also won two Emmys:
  - The Primetime Emmy Engineering Award in September 2008 for the High Profile of the standard
  - The Technology and Engineering Emmy Award in January 2009 (for the standard as a whole)
- The MPEG-2 transport stream format was recognized by a Technology and Engineering Emmy Award in 2014.
- The High Efficiency Video Coding (HEVC) standard was recognized by a Primetime Emmy Engineering Award in 2017.
- The JPEG standard was recognized by a Primetime Emmy Engineering Award in 2019.
- The ISO Base Media File Format (ISOBMFF) standard was recognized by a Technology and Engineering Emmy Award in 2021.
- Two Technology and Engineering Emmy Awards were received in 2022:
  - The MPEG-DASH video streaming protocol
  - The Open Font Format standard
- The MPEG Common Media Application Format standard (CMAF) was recognized by a Technology and Engineering Emmy Award in 2025

In addition, on at least four other occasions, Emmy awards were also given to participating companies and other related organizations for the development or implementation of SC 29 standards.

- A Primetime Emmy Engineering Award in 1995, given to C-Cube Microsystems for making a chipset implementing MPEG standards.
- A Technology and Engineering Emmy Award given in 2008 given to Tandberg Television and DirecTV for developing systems for HDTV using MPEG-4 AVC
- A Technology and Engineering Emmy Award given in 2014 to the Video Services Forum, Media Links, Nevion, DVBlink, Harris Broadcast Corporation (which later became Imagine Communications), Ericsson, Artel Video Systems, Barco-Silex and IntoPix for interoperable implementation of the JPEG 2000 standard
- An Engineering, Science and Technology Emmy Award (formerly known as a Primetime Emmy Engineering Award) in 2025, given to Fraunhofer IIS and IntoPIX for the development of the JPEG XS low-latency, low-complexity image coding standard

Additionally, the Charles F. Jenkins Lifetime Achievement Award (a Primetime Engineering Emmy Award) was presented in 2017 to Leonardo Chiariglione, the co-founder (with Hiroshi Yasuda) and longtime chairman of MPEG, in recognition of his 30 years of leadership in establishing worldwide standards for digital video compression and transmission in SC 29.

== Scope ==
The scope of ISO/IEC JTC 1/SC 29 includes the development of standards for "efficient coding of digital representations of images, audio and moving pictures" and other digital information, along with supporting media systems and associated quality of experience and performance metrics.

== Structure ==
ISO/IEC JTC 1/SC 29 has eight active working groups (WGs), each of which carries out specific tasks in standards development within scope of the subcommittee. It also contains five advisory groups (AG) for coordination and to provide expertise on particular subjects. Working groups and advisory groups can be created or disbanded by decisions of the subcommittee and are ordinarily chartered for renewable three-year terms. The focus of each working group is described in the group's terms of reference. The active advisory groups and working groups of SC 29 are:

Group	Working area	Convenor
AG 1	Chair support team and management	Teruhiko Suzuki (Sony, Japan)
AG 2	MPEG Technical coordination	Prof. Joern Ostermann (University of Hannover, Germany)
AG 3	MPEG Liaison and communication	Prof. Kyuheon Kim (Kyung Hee University, Korea)
AG 4	JPEG and MPEG coordination	Prof. Peter Schelkens (Vrije Universiteit Brussel, Belgium)
AG 5	MPEG Visual quality assessment	Dr. Mathias Wien (RWTH Aachen University, Germany)
WG 1	JPEG Coding of digital representations of images	Prof. Touradj Ebrahimi (EPFL, Switzerland)
WG 2	MPEG Technical requirements	Dr. Igor Curcio (Nokia, Finland)
WG 3	MPEG Systems	Dr. Youngkwon Lim (Samsung, Korea)
WG 4	MPEG Video coding	Prof. Lu Yu (Zhejiang University, China)
WG 5	MPEG Joint Video Experts Team with ITU-T Study Group 21 (a.k.a. JVET)	Prof. Jens-Rainer Ohm (RWTH Aachen University, Germany)
WG 6	MPEG Audio coding	Prof. Thomas Sporer (Fraunhofer IDMT, Germany)
WG 7	MPEG 3D Graphics and haptics coding	Prof. Marius Preda (Institut Mines-Télécom SudParis, France)
WG 8	MPEG Genomic coding	Dr. Marco Mattavelli (EPFL, Switzerland)

== Collaborations ==
ISO/IEC JTC 1/SC 29 works in close collaboration with a number of other organizations or subcommittees, both internal and external to ISO or IEC, in order to avoid conflicting or duplicative work. Organizations internal to ISO or IEC that collaborate with or are in liaison to SC 29 include:

- ISO/IEC JTC 1/SC 2, Coded character sets
- ISO/IEC JTC 1/SC 6, Telecommunications and information exchange between systems
- ISO/IEC JTC 1/SC 24, Computer graphics, image processing and environmental data representation
- ISO/IEC JTC 1/SC 27, Information security, cybersecurity and privacy protection
- ISO/IEC JTC 1/SC 34, Document description and processing languages
- ISO/IEC JTC 1/SC 41, Internet of things and digital twin
- ISO/IEC JTC 1/SC 42, Artificial intelligence
- ISO/TC 36, Cinematography
- ISO/TC 37, Terminology and other language and content resources
- ISO/TC 37/SC 4, Language resource management
- ISO/TC 42, Photography
- ISO/TC 46/SC 9, Identification and description
- ISO/TC 130, Graphic technology
- ISO/TC 171, Document management applications
- ISO/TC 211, Geographic information/Geomatics
- ISO/TC 223, Societal security
- ISO/TC 276, Biotechnology
- IEC TC 9, Electrical equipment and systems for railways
- IEC TC 100, Audio, video and multimedia systems and equipment

Some organizations external to ISO or IEC that collaborate with or are in liaison to ISO/IEC JTC 1/SC 29, include:

- 3rd Generation Partnership Project (3GPP)
- Advanced Function Presentation Consortium (AFPC)
- Alliance for Telecommunications Industry Solutions (ATIS)
- Asia-Pacific Broadcasting Union (ABU)
- The Association for the International Collective Management of Audiovisual Works (AGICOA)
- Audio Engineering Society (AES)
- Audio Video Coding Standard Workgroup of China (AVS)
- Advanced Television Systems Committee (ATSC)
- Consultative Committee for Space Data Systems (CCSDS)
- DICOM Standards Committee
- Digital TV Group (DTG)
- Digital Video Broadcasting (DVB)
- Dublin Core Metadata Initiative (DCMI)
- Ecma International
- Entertainment Content Ecosystem
- European Broadcasting Union (EBU)
- European Committee for Standardization (CEN)
- European Network on Quality of Experience in Multimedia Systems and Services (QUALINET)
- ETSI
- International Confederation of Societies of Authors and Composers (CISAC)
- International Commission on Illumination (CIE)
- International DOI Foundation (IDF)
- International Federation of Film Producers Associations (FIAPF)
- International Imaging Industry Association (I3A)
- Internet Streaming Media Alliance (ISMA)
- The Internet Society
- International Federation of the Phonographic Industry (IFPI)
- International Multimedia Telecommunications Consortium (IMTC)
- International Press and Telecommunication Council (IPTC)
- Institute of Electrical and Electronics Engineers (IEEE)
- ITU-R
- ITU-T
- Khronos Group
- MIDI Manufacturers Association (MMA)
- National Information Standards Organization (NISO)
- North Atlantic Treaty Organization (NATO)
- Object Management Group (OMG)
- Open Geospatial Consortium (OGC)
- The Open IPTV Forum (OIPF)
- Open Mobile Alliance Ltd. (OMA)
- Open Planets Foundation (OPF)
- Society of Motion Picture and Television Engineers (SMPTE)
- The European Insurance and Reinsurance Federation (CEA)
- Video Electronics Standards Association (VESA)
- Video Services Forum (VSF)
- Virtual World Forum (VirF)
- Wireless Gigabit Alliance
- World Intellectual Property Organization (WIPO)
- World Wide Web Consortium (W3C)

== Member countries ==
Countries pay a fee to be a member of an ISO/IEC JTC 1 subcommittee.

The 31 "P" (participating) members of ISO/IEC JTC 1/SC 29 are: Australia, Austria, Belgium, Brazil, Canada, China, Cyprus, Finland, France, Germany, India, Iran, Ireland, Israel, Italy, Japan, Kazakstan, Korea (Republic of), Lebanon, Netherlands, Poland, Portugal, Russian Federation, Singapore, Spain, Sweden, Switzerland, Ukraine, United Kingdom, the United States, and Turkey.

The 17 "O" (observing) members of ISO/IEC JTC 1/SC 29 are: Argentina, Armenia, Bosnia and Herzegovina, Czech Republic, Denmark, Greece, Hong Kong, Hungary, Indonesia, Malaysia, Morocco, Pakistan, Romania, Saudi Arabia, Serbia, Slovakia, and South Africa.

== Published standards ==
As of May 2024, ISO/IEC JTC 1/SC 29 is currently responsible for 617 currently published standards within the field of coded representation of audio, picture, multimedia, and hypermedia information, including the following selected examples:

ISO/IEC Standard	Title	Status	Description	WG
ISO/IEC 10918-1	Information technology – Digital compression and coding of continuous-tone still images: Requirements and guidelines	Published (1994)	Specifies: Processes for converting source image data to compressed image data; Processes for converting compressed image data to reconstructed image data; Coded representations for compressed image data; Provides guidance on how to implement these processes in practice;	1
ISO/IEC 10918-5	Information technology – Digital compression and coding of continuous-tone still images: JPEG File Interchange Format (JFIF)	Published (2013)	Specifies the JPEG File Interchange Format (JFIF)	1
ISO/IEC 11544	Information technology – Coded representation of picture and audio information – Progressive bi-level image compression	Published (1993)	Defines a bit-preserving (lossless) compression method for coding image bit-planes and is particularly suitable for two-tone (including black and white) images	1
ISO/IEC 15444-1	Information technology – JPEG 2000 image coding system: Core coding system	Published (2004)	Defines a set of lossless and lossy compression methods for coding bi-level, continuous-tone, grey-scale, palletized color, or continuous-tone color digital still images	1
ISO/IEC TR 29199-1	Information technology – JPEG XR image coding system – Part 1: System architecture	Published (2011)	Provides a technical overview and informative guidelines for applications of JPEG XR image coding as specified in Part 2 of ISO/IEC 29199	1
ISO/IEC 29199-2	Information technology – JPEG XR image coding system – Part 2: Image coding specification	Published (2012)	Specifies a coding format, known as JPEG XR, which is designed primarily for use for continuous-tone photographic content	1
ISO/IEC 11172-1	Information technology – Coding of moving pictures and associated audio for digital storage media at up to about 1,5 Mbit/s – Part 1: Systems	Published (1993)	Specifies the system layer of the coding of video and audio as specified in Parts 2 and 3 of ISO/IEC 11172 known as MPEG-1, which supports the synchronization of multiple compressed streams on playback, the interleaving of multiple compressed streams into a single stream, the initialization of buffering for playback start up, continuous buffer management, and time identification	11 (now 3)
ISO/IEC 13818-1	Information technology – Generic coding of moving pictures and associated audio information – Part 1: Systems	Published (1996)	Specifies the system layer of coding, and is meant to support the combination of video and audio coding methods defined in Parts 2 and 3 of ISO/IEC 13818, known as MPEG-2	11 (now 3)
ISO/IEC 13818-2	Information technology – Generic coding of moving pictures and associated audio information – Part 2: Video	Published (1996)	Specifies a compression format for interlaced and progressive-scan video	11 (now 5 = JVET)
ISO/IEC 13818-3	Information technology – Generic coding of moving pictures and associated audio information – Part 3: Audio	Published (1995)	Specifies an MPEG-1 audio backward compatible audio compression format	11 (now 6)
ISO/IEC 13818-7	Information technology – Generic coding of moving pictures and associated audio information – Part 7: Advanced Audio Coding	Published (1997)	Specifies an audio compression format, known as AAC (Advanced Audio Coding)	11 (now 6)
ISO/IEC 14496-1	Information technology – Coding of audio-visual objects – Part 1: Systems	Published (1999)	Specifies the system-level functionalities for the communication of interactive audio-visual scenes	11 (now 3)
ISO/IEC 14496-2	Information technology – Coding of audio-visual objects – Part 2: Visual	Published (1999)	Provides the specification of: Video coding tools, object types, and profiles; Coding tools, object types, and profiles for mapping of still textures into visual scenes; Coding tools, object types, and profiles for human face and body animation; Coding tools, object types, and profiles for the animation of 2D warping grids with uniform and irregular topography	11 (now 4)
ISO/IEC 14496-3	Information technology – Coding of audio-visual objects – Part 3: Audio	Published (1999)	Specifies a format for audio object	11 (now 6)
ISO/IEC 14496-10 (available free)	Information technology – Coding of audio-visual objects – Part 10: Advanced Video Coding	Published (2003)	Specifies advanced video coding for the coding of audio-visual objects, known as AVC (Advanced Video Coding)	11 (now 5 = JVET)
ISO/IEC 14496-22	Information technology – Coding of audio-visual objects – Part 22: Open Font Format	Published (2009)	Specifies the Open Font Format (OFF), the ISO derivative of the OpenType font format	11 (now 3)
ISO/IEC 23003-1	Information technology – MPEG audio technologies – Part 1: MPEG Surround	Published (2007)	Describes the MPEG Surround standard which is meant for multi-channel audio compression	11 (now 6)
ISO/IEC 23003-3	Information technology – MPEG audio technologies – Part 3: Unified speech and audio coding	Published (2012)	Specifies a unified speech and audio codec that is capable of having coding signals with an arbitrary mix of speech and audio content	11 (now 6)
ISO/IEC 13522-5	Information technology – Coding of multimedia and hypermedia information – Part 5: Support for base-level interactive applications	Published (1997)	Specifies the semantics and final-form interchange syntax for MHEG-5 objects	12 (disbanded)

== See also ==
- ISO/IEC JTC 1
- List of ISO standards
- Japanese Industrial Standards Committee
- International Organization for Standardization
- International Electrotechnical Commission
