= Joint Bi-level Image Experts Group =

Standard organisation for image formats

Logo of Joint Bi-level Image Experts Group (as part of Joint Photographic Experts Group)

The Joint Bi-level Image Experts Group (JBIG) was a group of experts nominated by national standards bodies and major companies to work to produce standards for bi-level image coding. The "joint" refers to its status as a committee working on both ISO and ITU-T standards. It was one of two sub-groups of ISO/IEC Joint Technical Committee 1, Subcommittee 29, Working Group 1 (ISO/IEC JTC 1/SC 29/WG 1), whose official title is Coding of still pictures.

The Joint Bi-level Image Experts Group created the JBIG and JBIG2 standards. The group often meets jointly with the JPEG committee, which typically meets three times annually.

ISO/IEC JTC1 SC29 Working Group 1 (working together with ITU-T Study Group 16 – VCEG and previously also with Study Group 8 – SG8) is responsible for both JPEG and JBIG standards. It included two sub-groups: the Joint Photographic Experts Group (JPEG SG) and the Joint Bi-level Image experts Group (JBIG SG). After completing the 2019 edition of the JBIG2 standard, the JBIG subgroup was closed and its maintenance responsibilities were assigned to the general JPEG group.

In the mid-1980s, both CCITT (now ITU-T) and ISO had standardization groups for image coding: CCITT Study Group (SG) VIII (Telematic Services) and ISO TC97 SC2 WG8 (Coding of Audio and Picture Information). They were historically targeted on image communication. In 1986, it was decided to create the Joint (CCITT/ISO) Photographic Expert Group. In 1988, it was decided to create the Joint (CCITT/ISO) Bi-level Image Group – JBIG.

== Published standards ==
JBIG have developed following standards, which were published by ISO/IEC and/or ITU-T:

Joint Photographic Experts Group - developed standards
Common Name	Part	First public release date (First edition)	ISO/IEC Number	ITU Number	Formal Title
JBIG1		1993	ISO/IEC 11544	ITU-T Recommendations T.82, T.85	Information technology – Coded representation of picture and audio information – Progressive bi-level image compression
JBIG2		2001	ISO/IEC 14492	ITU-T Recommendations T.88, T.89	Information technology – Lossy/lossless coding of bi-level images

Note: The published JBIG2 standard was revised by three later amendments, which were consolidated into the current (2019) edition.

== See also ==
- Joint Photographic Experts Group (JPEG)
- Moving Picture Experts Group (MPEG)
