= Group 4 compression =

Bitstream encoding format for still images

CCITT Group 4 compression, also referred to as G4 or Modified Modified READ (MMR), is a lossless method of image compression used in Group 4 fax machines defined in the ITU-T T.6 fax standard. It is only used for bitonal (black-and-white) images. Group 4 compression is based on the Group 3 two-dimensional compression scheme (G3-2D), also known as Modified READ, which is in turn based on the Group 3 one-dimensional compression scheme (G3), also known as Modified Huffman coding. Group 4 compression is available in many proprietary image file formats as well as standardized formats such as TIFF, CALS, CIT (Intergraph Raster Type 24) and the PDF document format.

G4 offers a small improvement over G3-2D by removing the end-of-line (EOL) codes. G3 and G4 compression both treat an image as a series of horizontal black strips on a white page. Better compression is achieved when there are fewer unique black dots/lines on the page. Both G3-2D and G4 add a two-dimensional feature to achieve greater compression by taking advantage of vertical symmetry. A worst-case image would be an alternating pattern of single-pixel black and white dots offset by one pixel on even/odd lines. G4 compression would actually increase the file size on this type of image. G4 typically achieves a 20:1 (95%) compression ratio. For an 8.5"×11" page scanned at 200 DPI, this equates to a reduction from 467.5 kB to 23.4 kB.

== See also ==
- JBIG2
- Binary image
- Digital fax compression
