= Japanese Industrial Standards Committee =

Standards organization in Japan

- Company type: Independent committee
- Industry: standards organization
- Founded: 1949; Japan
- Headquarters: Tokyo, Japan
- Parent: Ministry of Economy, Trade and Industry
- Website: www.jisc.go.jp; www.jisc.go.jp/eng/index.html (in English)

The Japanese Industrial Standards Committee (日本産業標準調査会, Nihon Sangyō Hyōjun Chōsakai; JISC) is a standards organization and is the International Organization for Standardization (ISO) member body for Japan. It is also a member of the International Electrotechnical Commission.

The committee consists of a Council under the Ministry of Economy, Trade and Industry (METI), as well as two Boards established under it. Each of the Boards have their own Technical Committees, containing members which are parties among producers, dealers, users, consumers and academic circles.

The JISC establishes and maintains the Japanese Industrial Standards (JIS).
