= Alan Bovik =

American engineer (born 1958)

Al Bovik HonFRPS
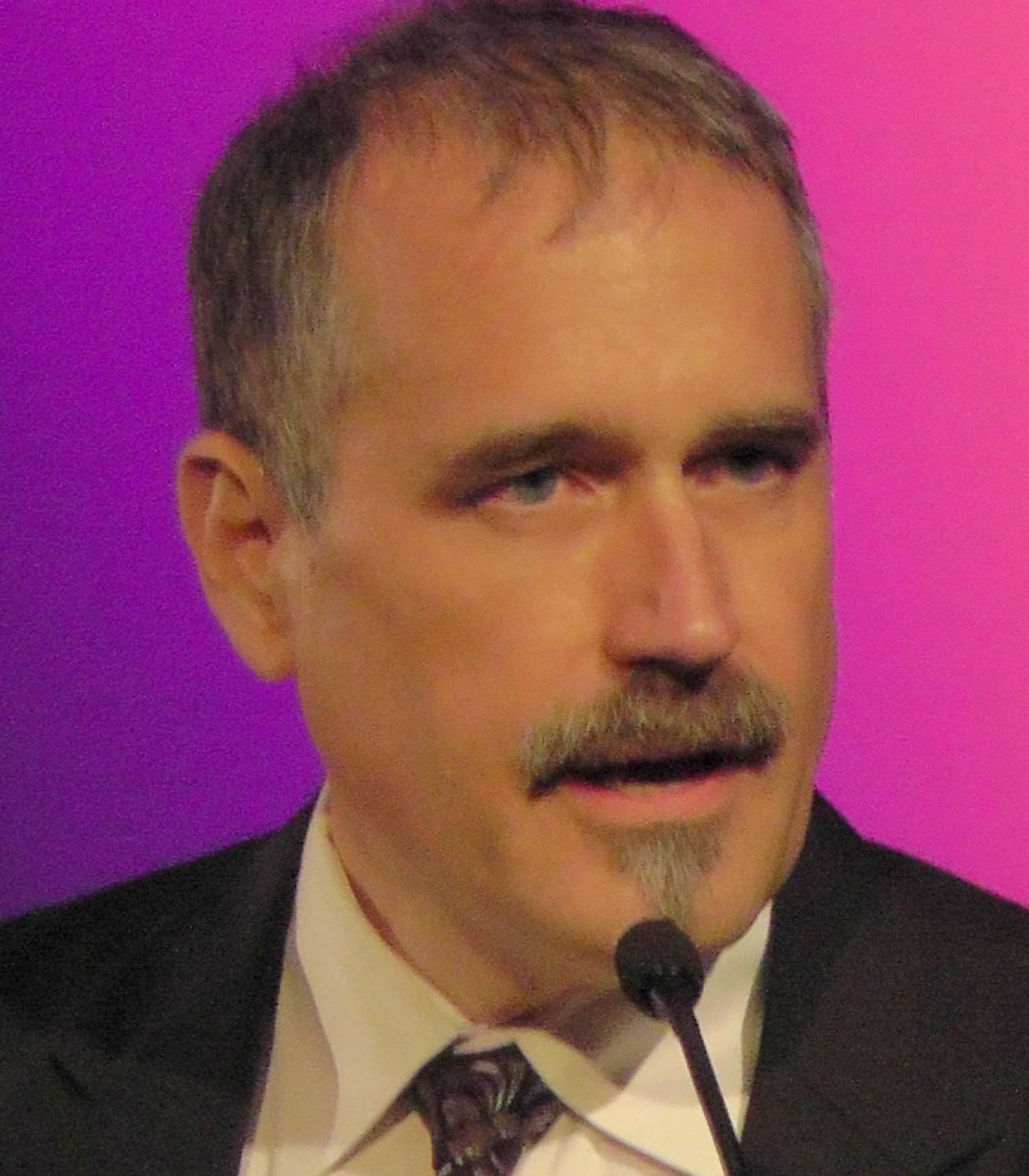
- Born: June 25, 1958 (age 68); Kirkwood, Missouri, U.S.
- Education: University of Illinois
- Awards: J J Thomson Medal (2026); John Fritz Medal (2024); IEEE Edison Medal (2022); Technology and Engineering Emmy Award (2021); RPS Progress Medal (2019); IEEE Fourier Award (2019); Edwin H. Land Medal (2017); Primetime Emmy Award (2015)
- Scientific career
- Fields: Digital television, digital photography, image processing, vision science, video processing
- Workplaces: University of Colorado Boulder
- Doctoral advisor: Thomas Huang; David C. Munson

Alan Conrad Bovik (born June 25, 1958) is an American engineer, computer scientist, vision scientist, and educator. He is a professor at the University of Colorado Boulder where he holds the Provost’s Chair in Engineering. He is a faculty member in the Department of Electrical, Computer, and Energy Engineering (ECEE) and is Director of Colorado’s Laboratory for Image and Video Engineering (LIVE). Previously he was a professor at The University of Texas at Austin (UT-Austin), where he held the Cockrell Family Regents Endowed Chair in the Cockrell School of Engineering.

Bovik received a Primetime Emmy Award in 2015 for his development of perception-based video quality measurement tools that are now standards in television production. He also received a Technology and Engineering Emmy Award in 2021 for the “development of perceptual metrics for video encoding optimization.”

== Work ==
Al Bovik was educated at the University of Illinois at Urbana–Champaign (PhD 1984). He has made numerous fundamental contributions to the fields of digital photography, digital television, digital image processing, digital video processing, digital cinema, and computational visual perception. He is particularly well known for his work on low-level vision, natural scene modeling, image quality, and video quality.

He has published more than 1000 technical articles, books, and patents in these areas. He is also the author/editor of The Handbook of Image and Video Processing (Academic Press, 2nd edition, 2005), with Zhou Wang of Modern Image Quality Assessment (Morgan and Claypool, 2006), and the author/editor of the companion books The Essential Guide to Image Processing and The Essential Guide to Video Processing (Academic Press, 2009). Overall, his work has been cited in the scientific and engineering literature more than 200,000 times according to Google Scholar. He is one of the most highly cited computer scientists or engineers in the world according to the Web of Science.

Bovik is an elected member of the United States National Academy of Engineering (NAE), an elected Foreign Fellow of the Indian National Academy of Engineering (INAE), an elected Fellow of the U.S. National Academy of Inventors, and an elected foreign member of Academia Europaea (2023). He is also a Life Fellow of the IEEE, a Fellow of Optica and of the Society of Photo-Optical and Instrumentation Engineers (SPIE), an Honorary Fellow of the Royal Photographic Society (HonFRPS) and an Honorary Member of the Society for Imaging Science and Technology (IS&T). He is a voting member of the Academy of Television Arts and Sciences (Television Academy) and was named an inaugural member of its Science and Technology Peer Group. He was named a Distinguished Alumnus of the University of Illinois at Urbana–Champaign in 2008.

Bovik is credited with the development of order statistic filters, the image modulation model, computational modeling of visual texture perception, theories of foveated image processing, and for widely used and disseminated image quality and video quality computational models and measurement tools that are used throughout the television, cinematic, streaming video, and social media industries. His contributions include the invention or co-invention of the Emmy Award-winning Structural Similarity (SSIM) video quality measurement tool, the MOVIE Index, the Visual Information Fidelity (VIF) algorithms, the FUNQUE family of video quality models, and his extensive contributions to the Emmy Award-winning VMAF system, all reference models that predict human perception of image quality or distortion; the RRED indices, which are a family of reduced reference image and video quality prediction models, and BRISQUE, BLIINDS, DIIVINE, NIQE, and ChipQA, which are a new breed of image and video quality prediction models that produce accurate predictions of human judgments of picture quality without using reference information. His high-dynamic range (HDR) add-on model HDRMAX, which improves the quality prediction performance of leading models is marketed and used worldwide. His picture and video quality models SSIM, MS-SSIM, VIF, VMAF, MOVIE, BRISQUE, FUNQUE, NIQE, ChipQA, and HDRMAX currently process a significant percentage of all bits transmitted both in the United States as well as globally, and are implemented in commercial cable, satellite, broadcast, streaming video, television, home cinema / disc, and social media quality monitoring and control workflows around the world.

He was the founder and First General Chair of the IEEE International Conference on Image Processing (ICIP). He also co-founded (with David Munson, Jr.) the IEEE Transactions on Image Processing and was its longest-serving Editor-in-Chief, with a tenure of six years.

== Educational activities ==
Bovik's academic legacy includes serving as the supervising professor of more than 70 PhD graduates, more than 50 master's degree recipients, and more than two dozen post-doctoral researchers.

He has created books and online courseware, including The Handbook of Image and Video Processing (Academic Press, 2000, 2005), Modern Image Quality Assessment (Morgan & Claypool, 2006), The Essential Guide to Image Processing (Academic Press, 2009), and The Essential Guide to Video Processing (Elsevier Academic Press, 2009). His award-winning online courseware is used internationally: SIVA – Courseware for Signal, Image, Video and Audio Processing. This online courseware offers online curricula for digital image and video processing and digital signal processing. SIVA includes hundreds of signal, image and video processing demonstrations delivering live, interactive audio-visual experiences of signal and image processing algorithms.

== Awards ==
Bovik has received a number of major international awards. These include:

- The IET J J Thomson Medal in October 2026, “For pioneering the use of visual neuroscience to create globally pervasive systems that control nearly all streaming video, television, and social media.”
- The John Fritz Medal from the Society for Mining, Metallurgy, and Exploration in February 2025 “for foundational contributions to the theoretical and engineering aspects of perceptual picture and video quality prediction, leading to systems that ensure optimized visual quality for hundreds of millions of viewers daily.”
- The Edison Medal from the Institute of Electrical and Electronics Engineers (IEEE) in May 2022 "for pioneering high-impact scientific and engineering contributions leading to the perceptually optimized global streaming and sharing of visual media.”
- A BaM (“Bammy”) Award from the International Trade Association for Broadcast and Media (IABM) in December 2022 “for perceptual picture quality algorithms and databases for streaming and social media." BaM Awards are given to “any product that is recognized by the judging panel is not just an innovative solution but is genuinely important to the market and sets the standard in its category.”
- A Technology and Engineering Emmy Award from the National Academy of Television Arts and Sciences (NATAS) in October 2021 for the “development of perceptual metrics for video encoding optimization.”
- The Progress Medal from the Royal Photographic Society (RPS) in November 2019 "in recognition of any invention, research, publication or other contribution which has resulted in an important advance in the scientific or technological development of photography or imaging in the widest sense." Bovik was also named an Honorary Fellow of RPS (HonFRPS).
- The IEEE Fourier Award in 2019 “For seminal contributions and high-impact innovations to the theory and application of perception-based image and video processing.”
- The Edwin H. Land Medal from The Optical Society of America in 2017 “For substantially shaping the direction and advancement of modern perceptual image quality theory, and for energetically engaging industry to transform his ideas into global practice.”
- A Primetime Emmy Award (Primetime Emmy Engineering Award) for Outstanding Achievement in Engineering Development from the Academy of Television Arts and Sciences (The Television Academy) in October 2015 for his work on video quality prediction technology.
- The Norbert Wiener Society Award from the IEEE Signal Processing Society in 2013, “For fundamental contributions to digital image processing theory, technology, leadership and education.”

In addition he has been recognized by the following honors:

- 1997: Leo L. Beranek Meritorious Service Award of the IEEE Signal Processing Society
- 2000: IEEE Third Millennium Medal
- 2005: Claude Shannon-Harry Nyquist Technical Achievement Award of the IEEE Signal Processing Society
- 2007: Carl Friedrich Gauss Education Award of the IEEE Signal Processing Society
- 2008: Distinguished Alumnus Award, University of Illinois at Urbana-Champaign
- 2009: IEEE Signal Processing Society Best Paper Award
- 2009: The University of Texas at Austin Hocott Distinguished Centennial Engineering Research Award
- 2010: IS&T/SPIE Imaging Scientist of the Year
- 2012: SPIE Technology Achievement Award
- 2013: IEEE Signal Processing Magazine Best Paper Award
- 2013: IEEE Signal Processing Society Young Author Best Paper Award (co-author)
- 2013: IS&T Honorary Member Award
- 2016: IEEE Circuits and Systems for Video Technology Best Paper Award
- 2016: The University of Texas at Austin Joe J. King Professional Engineering Achievement Award
- 2017: Google Scholar Classic Paper in the area Signal Processing
- 2017: Google Scholar Classic Paper in the area Computer Vision & Pattern Recognition
- 2017: IEEE Signal Processing Letters Best Paper Award
- 2017: IEEE Signal Processing Society Sustained Impact Paper Award
- 2018: EURASIP Best Paper Award
- 2019: IEEE ICIP Pioneer Award, “For unparalleled leadership and contributions to the image processing community.”
- 2020: EURASIP Best Paper Award
- 2020: The University of Texas at Austin Career Research Excellence Award
