= MEMC =

MEMC may refer to:

- MEMC Electronic Materials, a United States manufacturer of silicon wafers for the semiconductor industry
- MEMC, a support chip in Acorn Computers
- mEMC, mammalian endoplasmic reticulum membrane protein complex
- Motion estimation/motion compensation; see Video super resolution § Aligned by motion estimation and motion compensation
- Mount Elizabeth Medical Centre, in Singapore

== See also ==
- Pro-Emancipation Movement of Chilean Women (MeMCh)
