= Image quality =

Characteristic of an image

Image quality can refer to the level of accuracy with which different imaging systems capture, process, store, compress, transmit and display the signals that form an image. Another definition refers to image quality as "the weighted combination of all of the visually significant attributes of an image". The difference between the two definitions is that one focuses on the characteristics of signal processing in different imaging systems and the latter on the perceptual assessments that make an image pleasant for human viewers.

Image quality should not be mistaken with image fidelity. Image fidelity refers to the ability of a process to render a given copy in a perceptually similar way to the original (without distortion or information loss), i.e., through a digitization or conversion process from analog media to digital image.

The process of determining the level of accuracy is called Image Quality Assessment (IQA). Image quality assessment is part of the quality of experience measures. Image quality can be assessed using two methods: subjective and objective. Subjective methods are based on the perceptual assessment of a human viewer about the attributes of an image or set of images, while objective methods are based on computational models that can predict perceptual image quality. Objective and subjective methods aren't necessarily consistent or accurate between each other: a human viewer might perceive stark differences in quality in a set of images where a computer algorithm might not.

Subjective methods are costly, require a large number of people, and are impossible to automate in real-time. Therefore, the goal of image quality assessment research is to design algorithms for objective assessment that are also consistent with subjective assessments. The development of such algorithms has a lot of potential applications. They can be used to monitor image quality in control quality systems, to benchmark image processing systems and algorithms and to optimize imaging systems.

== Image quality factors ==
The image formation process is affected by several distortions between the moment in which the signals travel through to and reach the capture surface, and the device or mean in which signals are displayed. Although optical aberrations can cause great distortions in image quality, they are not part of the field of Image Quality Assessment. Optical aberrations caused by lenses belong to the optics area and not to the signal processing areas.

In an ideal model, there's no quality loss between the emission of the signal and the surface in which the signal is being captured on. For example, a digital image is formed by electromagnetic radiation or other waves as they pass through or reflect off objects. That information is then captured and converted into digital signals by an image sensor. The sensor, however, has nonidealities that limit its performance.

== Image quality assessment methods ==
Image quality can be assessed using objective or subjective methods. In the objective method, image quality assessments are performed by different algorithms that analyze the distortions and degradations introduced in an image. Subjective image quality assessments are a method based on the way in which humans experience or perceive image quality. Objective and subjective methods of quality assessment don't necessarily correlate with each other. An algorithm might have a similar value for an image and its altered or degraded versions, while a subjective method might perceive a stark contrast in quality for the same image and its versions.

== Subjective methods ==
Subjective methods for image quality assessment belong to the larger area of psychophysics research, a field that studies the relationship between physical stimulus and human perceptions. A subjective IQA method will typically consist on applying mean opinion score techniques, where a number of viewers rate their opinions based on their perceptions of image quality. These opinions are afterwards mapped onto numerical values.

These methods can be classified depending on the availability of the source and test images:

- Single-stimulus: the viewer only has the test image and is not aware of the source image.
- Double-stimulus: the viewer has both the source and test image.

Since visual perception can be affected by environmental and viewing conditions, the International Telecommunication Union produced a set of recommendations for standardized testing methods for subjective image quality assessment.

It has been found that affective content in images can influence subjective evaluations of image quality, such that viewers’ emotional responses to images can bias their ratings. This can lead to higher quality scores for images that are more emotionally engaging, regardless of technical quality. This affective bias suggests that emotional content may distort image quality assessments, highlighting the need for evaluation methods to consider such influences to improve objectivity.

== Objective methods ==
Wang & Bovik (2006) classify the objective methods with the following criteria: (a) the availability of an original image; (b) on the basis of their application scopes and (c) on the model of a Human Visual System simulation to assess quality. Keelan (2002) classifies the methods based on (a) direct experimental measurements; (b) system modeling and (c) visual assessment against calibrated standards.

- Full-reference (FR) methods – FR metrics try to assess the quality of a test image by comparing it with a reference image that is assumed to have perfect quality, e.g. the original of an image versus a JPEG-compressed version of the image.
- Reduced-reference (RR) methods – RR metrics assess the quality of a test and reference image based on a comparison of features extracted from both images.
- No-reference (NR) methods – NR metrics try to assess the quality of a test image without any reference to the original one.

Image quality metrics can also be classified in terms of measuring only one specific type of degradation (e.g., blurring, blocking, or ringing), or taking into account all possible signal distortions, that is, multiple kinds of artifacts.

== Image quality attributes ==
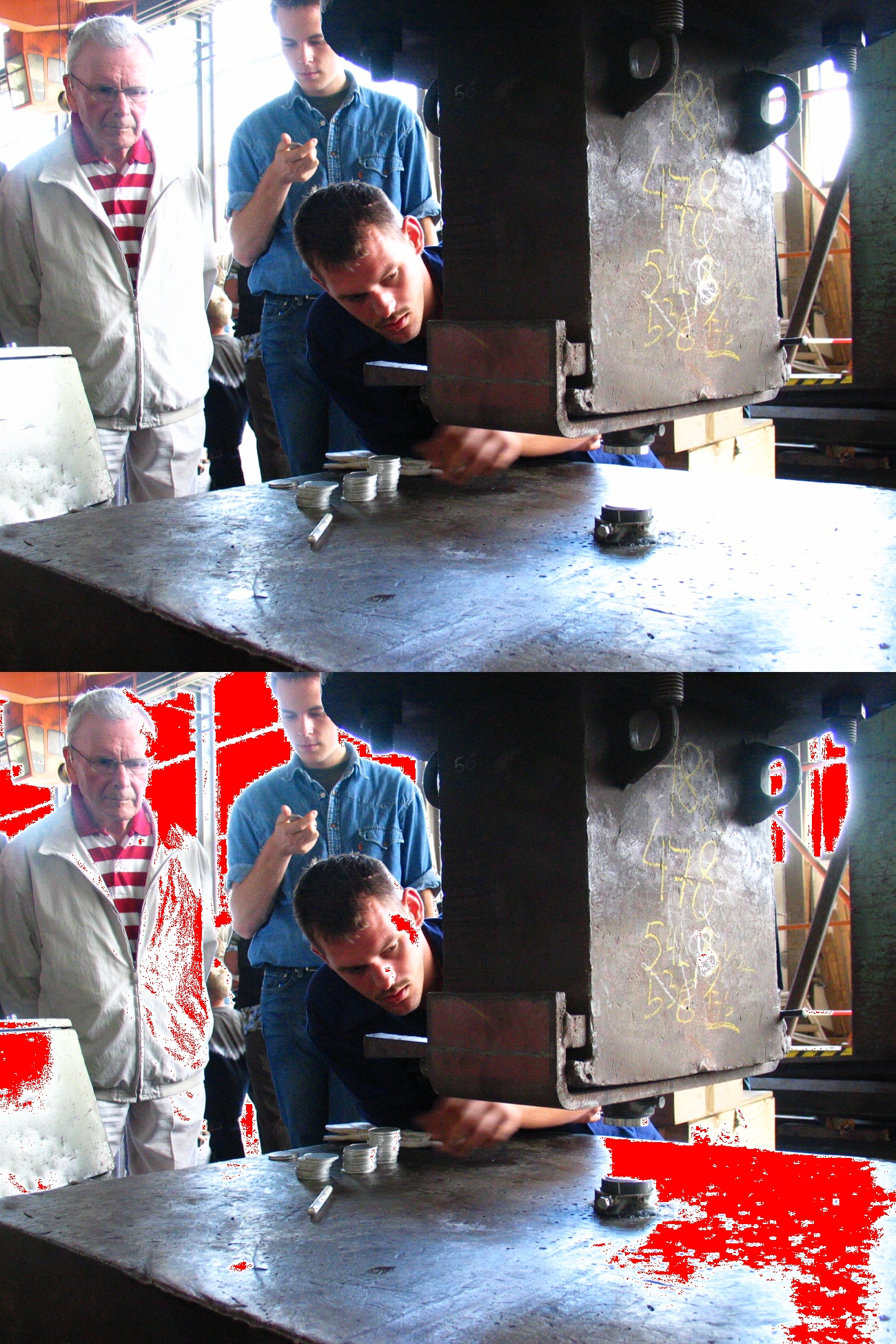
Blown highlights are detrimental to image quality. Top: Original image. Bottom: Blown areas highlighted in red.

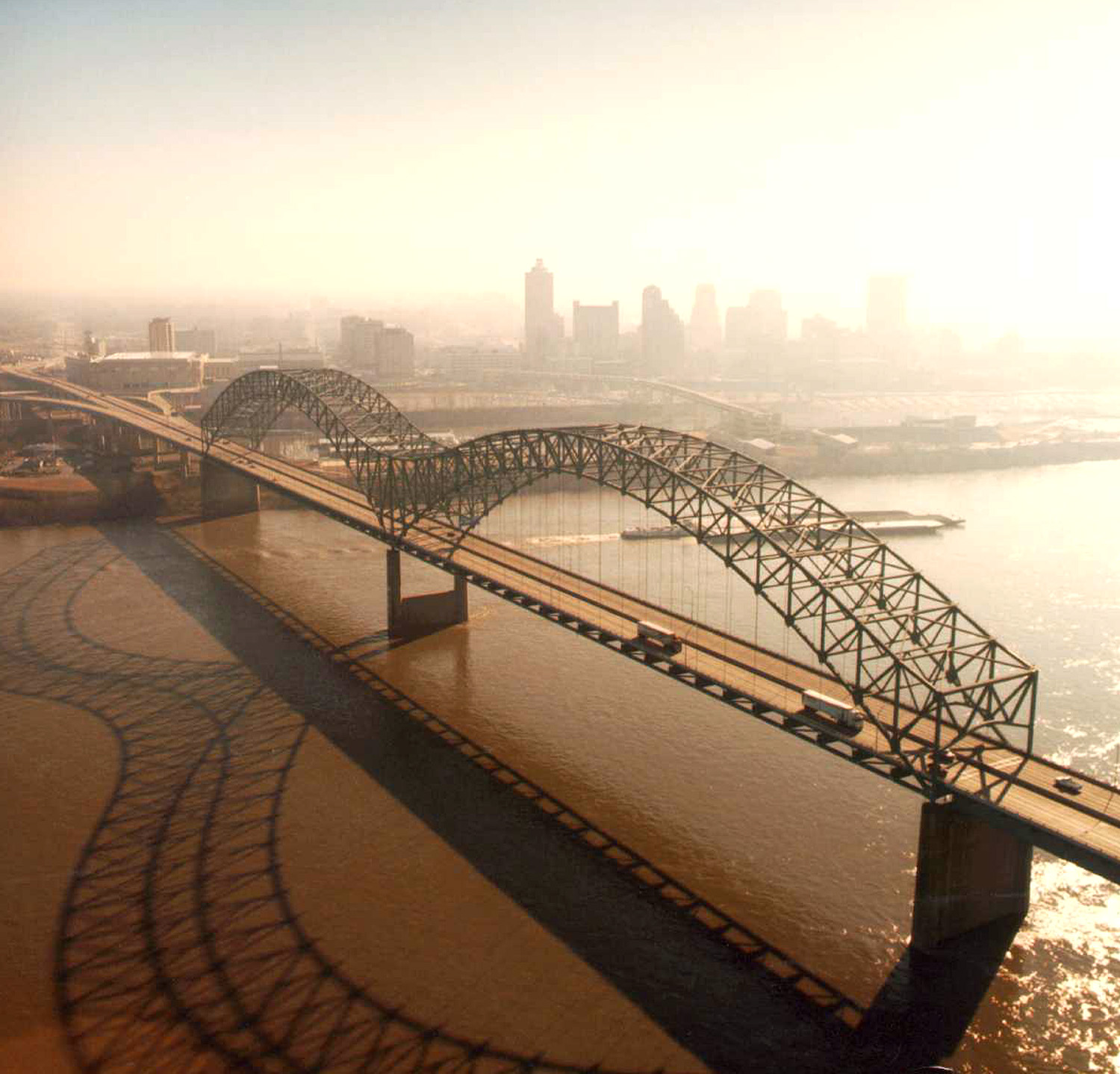
At full resolution, this image has clearly visible compression artifacts, for example along the edges of the rightmost trusses.

- Sharpness determines the amount of detail an image can convey. System sharpness is affected by the lens (design and manufacturing quality, focal length, aperture, and distance from the image center) and sensor (pixel count and anti-aliasing filter). In the field, sharpness is affected by camera shake (a good tripod can be helpful), focus accuracy, and atmospheric disturbances (thermal effects and aerosols). Lost sharpness can be restored by sharpening, but sharpening has limits. Oversharpening, can degrade image quality by causing "halos" to appear near contrast boundaries. Images from many compact digital cameras are sometimes oversharpened to compensate for lower image quality.
- Noise is a random variation of image density, visible as grain in film and pixel level variations in digital images. It arises from the effects of basic physics— the photon nature of light and the thermal energy of heat— inside image sensors. Typical noise reduction (NR) software reduces the visibility of noise by smoothing the image, excluding areas near contrast boundaries. This technique works well, but it can obscure fine, low contrast detail.
- Dynamic range (or exposure range) is the range of light levels a camera can capture, usually measured in f-stops, EV (exposure value), or zones (all factors of two in exposure). It is closely related to noise: high noise implies low dynamic range.
- Tone reproduction is the relationship between scene luminance and the reproduced image brightness.
- Contrast, also known as gamma, is the slope of the tone reproduction curve in a log-log space. High contrast usually involves loss of dynamic range — loss of detail, or clipping, in highlights or shadows.
- Color accuracy is an important but ambiguous image quality factor. Many viewers prefer enhanced color saturation; the most accurate color isn't necessarily the most pleasing. Nevertheless, it is important to measure a camera's color response: its color shifts, saturation, and the effectiveness of its white balance algorithms.
- Distortion is an aberration that causes straight lines to curve. It can be troublesome for architectural photography and metrology (photographic applications involving measurement). Distortion tends to be noticeable in low cost cameras, including cell phones, and low cost DSLR lenses. It is usually very easy to see in wide angle photos. It can be now be corrected in software.
- Vignetting, or light falloff, darkens images near the corners. It can be significant with wide angle lenses.
- Exposure accuracy can be an issue with fully automatic cameras and with video cameras where there is little or no opportunity for post-exposure tonal adjustment. Some even have exposure memory: exposure may change after very bright or dark objects appear in a scene.
- Lateral chromatic aberration (LCA), also called "color fringing", including purple fringing, is a lens aberration that causes colors to focus at different distances from the image center. It is most visible near corners of images. LCA is worst with asymmetrical lenses, including ultrawides, true telephotos and zooms. It is strongly affected by demosaicing.
- Lens flare, including "veiling glare" is stray light in lenses and optical systems caused by reflections between lens elements and the inside barrel of the lens. It can cause image fogging (loss of shadow detail and color) as well as "ghost" images that can occur in the presence of bright light sources in or near the field of view.
- Color moiré is artificial color banding that can appear in images with repetitive patterns of high spatial frequencies, like fabrics or picket fences. It is affected by lens sharpness, the anti-aliasing (lowpass) filter (which softens the image), and demosaicing software. It tends to be worst with the sharpest lenses.
- Artifacts – software (especially operations performed during RAW conversion) can cause significant visual artifacts, including data compression and transmission losses (e.g. Low quality JPEG), oversharpening "halos" and loss of fine, low-contrast detail.

== See also ==
- Mean squared error (MSE)
- Peak signal-to-noise ratio (PSNR)
- Structural similarity (SSIM)
- Visual Information Fidelity (VIF)
- Human visual system
- Subjective video quality
- Video quality
- Just-noticeable difference
- Psychophysics
