= Czekanowski distance =

Per-pixel quality metric

The Czekanowski distance (sometimes shortened as CZD) is a per-pixel quality metric that estimates quality or similarity by measuring differences between pixels. Because it compares vectors with strictly non-negative elements, it is often used to compare colored images, as color values cannot be negative. This different approach has a better correlation with subjective quality assessment than PSNR.

== Definition ==
Androutsos et al. give the Czekanowski coefficient as follows:

$d_z(i,j) = 1 - \frac{ 2\sum^{p}_{k=1} \text{min}(x_{ik},\ x_{jk})}{ \sum^{p}_{k=1}( x_{ik} + x_{jk} ) }$

Where a pixel $x_i$ is being compared to a pixel $x_j$ on the k-th band of color – usually one for each of red, green and blue.

For a pixel matrix of size $M \times N$, the Czekanowski coefficient can be used in an arithmetic mean spanning all pixels to calculate the Czekanowski distance as follows:

$$\frac{1}{MN}\sum^{M-1}_{i=0}\sum^{N-1}_{j=0}\begin{pmatrix}1 - \frac{ 2\sum^{3}_{k=1} \text{min}(A_k(i,j),\ B_k(i,j))}{ \sum^{3}_{k=1}( A_k(i,j) + B_k(i, j) ) }\end{pmatrix}$$

Where $A_k(i,j)$ is the (i, j)-th pixel of the k-th band of a color image and, similarly, $B_k(i,j)$ is the pixel that it is being compared to.

== Uses ==
In the context of image forensics – for example, detecting if an image has been manipulated –, Rocha et al. report the Czekanowski distance is a popular choice for Color Filter Array (CFA) identification.
