= Outliers ratio =

In objective video quality assessment, the outliers ratio (OR) is a measure of the performance of an objective video quality metric. It is the ratio of "false" scores given by the objective metric to the total number of scores. The "false" scores are the scores that lie outside the interval

$$[\text{MOS} - 2\sigma, \text{MOS} + 2\sigma]$$

where MOS is the mean opinion score and σ is the standard deviation of the MOS.
