= Video quality =

Perceived video degradation

Video quality is a characteristic of a video passed through a video transmission or processing system that describes perceived video degradation (typically compared to the original video). Video processing systems may introduce some amount of distortion or artifacts in the video signal that negatively impact the user's perception of the system. For many stakeholders in video production and distribution, ensuring video quality is an important task.

Video quality evaluation is performed to describe the quality of a set of video sequences under study. Video quality can be evaluated objectively (by mathematical models) or subjectively (by asking users for their rating). Also, the quality of a system can be determined offline (i.e., in a laboratory setting for developing new codecs or services) or in-service (to monitor and ensure a certain level of quality).

== From analog to digital video ==
Since the world's first video sequence was recorded and transmitted, many video processing systems have been designed. Such systems encode video streams and transmit them over various kinds of networks or channels. In the age of analog video systems, it was possible to evaluate the quality aspects of a video processing system by calculating the system's frequency response using test signals (for example, a collection of color bars and circles).

Digital video systems have almost fully replaced analog ones, and quality evaluation methods have changed. The performance of a digital video processing and transmission system can vary significantly and depends on many factors, including the characteristics of the input video signal (e.g., amount of motion or spatial details), the settings used for encoding and transmission, and the channel fidelity or network performance.

== Objective video quality ==
Objective video quality models are mathematical models that approximate results from subjective quality assessment, in which human observers are asked to rate the quality of a video. In this context, the term model may refer to a simple statistical model in which several independent variables (e.g., the packet loss rate on a network and the video coding parameters) are fit against results obtained in a subjective quality evaluation test using regression techniques. A model may also be a more complicated algorithm implemented in software or hardware.

=== Terminology ===
The terms model and metric are often used interchangeably in the field to mean a descriptive statistic that provides an indicator of quality. The term "objective" refers to the fact that, in general, quality models are based on criteria that can be measured objectively, that is, free from human interpretation. They can be automatically evaluated by a computer program. Unlike a panel of human observers, an objective model should always deterministically output the same quality score for a given set of input parameters.

Objective quality models are sometimes also referred to as instrumental (quality) models, in order to emphasize their application as measurement instruments. Some authors suggest that the term "objective" is misleading, as it "implies that instrumental measurements bear objectivity, which they only do in cases where they can be generalized."

=== Classification of the objective video quality models ===
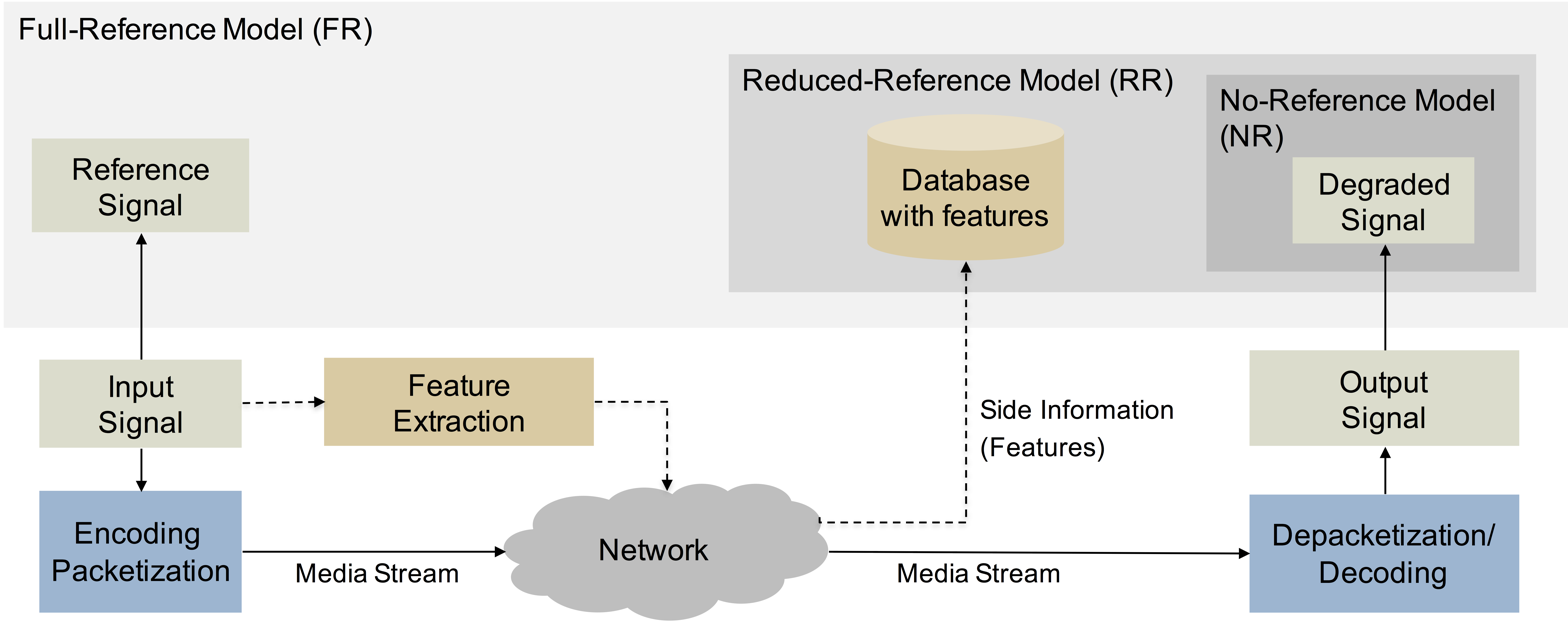
Classification of objective video quality models into Full-Reference, Reduced-Reference and No-Reference.

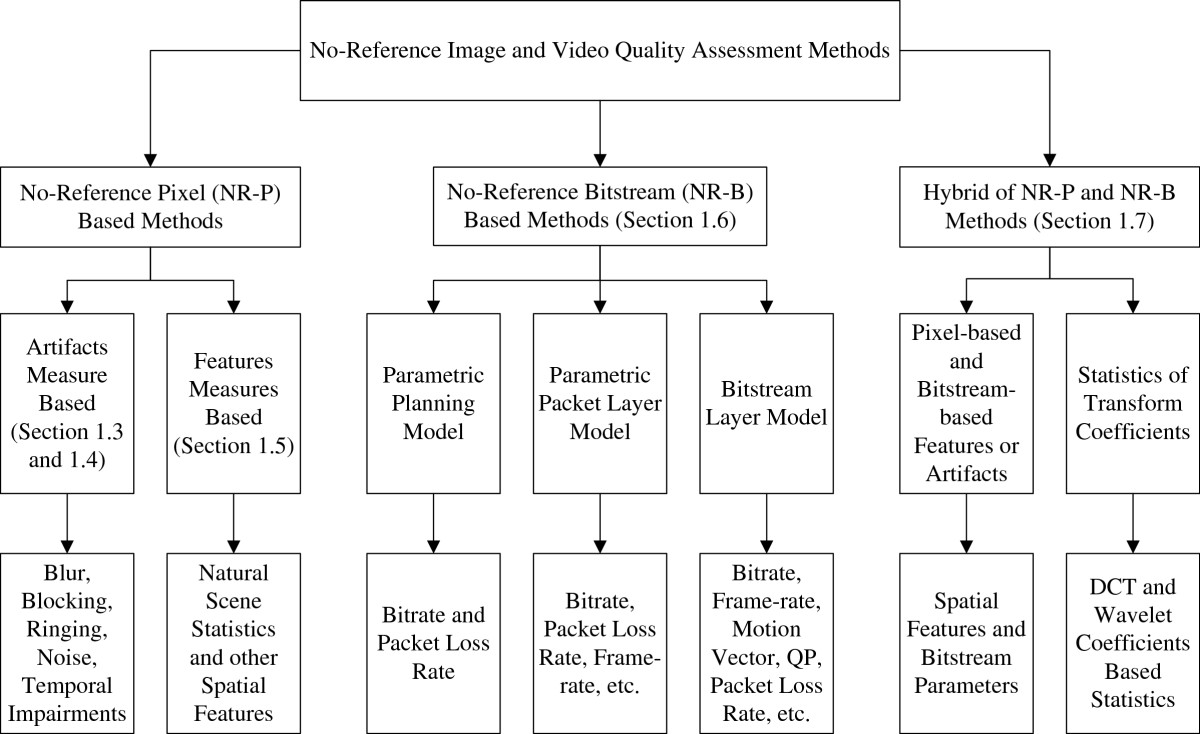
No-reference image and video quality assessment methods.

Objective models can be classified by the amount of information available about the original signal, the received signal, or whether there is a signal present at all:

- Full Reference Methods (FR): FR models compute the quality difference by comparing the original video signal against the received video signal. Typically, every pixel from the source is compared against the corresponding pixel in the received video, with no knowledge about the encoding or transmission process in between. More elaborate algorithms may choose to combine the pixel-based estimation with other approaches, such as those described below. FR models are usually the most accurate, at the expense of higher computational effort. As they require the availability of the original video before transmission or coding, they cannot be used in all situations (e.g., where the quality is measured from a client device).
- Reduced Reference Methods (RR): RR models extract some features of both videos and compare them to give a quality score. They are used when all the original video is not available or when it would be practically impossible to do so, e.g., in a transmission with a limited bandwidth. This makes them more efficient than FR models at the expense of lower accuracy.
- No-Reference Methods (NR): NR models try to assess the quality of a distorted video without any reference to the original signal. Due to the absence of an original signal, they may be less accurate than FR or RR approaches but are more efficient to compute. The Video Quality Experts Group has a dedicated working group on developing no-reference metrics (called NORM).
  - Pixel-Based Methods (NR-P): Pixel-based models use a decoded representation of the signal and analyze the quality based on the pixel information. Some of these evaluate specific degradation types only, such as blurring or other coding artifacts.
  - Parametric/Bitstream Methods (NR-B): These models make use of features extracted from the transmission container and/or video bitstream, e.g., MPEG-TS packet headers, motion vectors, and quantization parameters. They do not have access to the original signal and require no decoding of the video, which makes them more efficient. In contrast to NR-P models, they have no access to the final decoded signal. In some cases, the prediction accuracy of bitstream-based metrics can reach one full reference without requiring a reference.
  - Hybrid Methods (Hybrid NR-P-B): Hybrid models combine parameters extracted from the bitstream with a decoded video signal. They are therefore a mix between the NR-P and NR-B models.

=== Use of picture quality models for video quality estimation ===
Some models that are used for video quality assessment (such as PSNR or SSIM) are simply image quality models, whose output is calculated for every frame of a video sequence. An overview of recent no-reference image quality models has also been given in a journal paper by Shahid et al.

The quality measure of every frame in a video (as determined by an image quality model) can then be recorded and pooled over time to assess the quality of an entire video sequence. While this method is easy to implement, it does not factor in certain kinds of degradations that develop over time, such as the moving artifacts caused by packet loss and its concealment. A video quality model that considers the temporal aspects of quality degradations, like VQM or the MOVIE Index, may be able to produce more accurate predictions of human-perceived quality.

=== Video quality artifacts ===
The estimation of visual artifacts is a well known technique for estimating overall video quality. The majority of these artifacts are compression artifacts caused by lossy compression. Some of the attributes typically estimated by pixel-based metrics include:

Spatial

- Blurring — a result of loss of high spatial frequency image detail, usually at sharp edges.
- Blocking — is caused by multiple algorithms because of the internal representation of an image with blocks size 8, 16, or 32. With specific parameters, they can average pixels inside a block making blocks distinct
- Ringing, echoing or ghosting - takes the form of a "halo," band, or "ghost" near sharp edges.
- Color bleeding — occurs when the edges of one colour in the image unintentionally bleeds or overlaps into another colour
- Staircase noise — is a special case of blocking along a diagonal or curved edge. Rather than rendering as smooth, it takes on the appearance of stair steps

Temporal

- Flickering — is usually frequent brightness or colour changes along the time dimension. It is often broken out as fine-grain flickering and coarse-grain flickering.
- Mosquito noise — a variant of flickering, it's typified as haziness and/or shimmering around high-frequency content (sharp transitions between foreground entities and the background or hard edges).
- Floating — refers to illusory motion in certain regions while the surrounding areas remain static. Visually, these regions appear as if they were floating on top of the surrounding background
- Jerkiness or judder — is the perceived uneven or wobbly motion due to frame sampling. It's often caused by the conversion of 24 fps movies to a 30 or 60 fps video format.

=== Examples of video quality metrics ===
This section lists examples of video quality metrics.

Metric		Usage	Description
Full-Reference	PSNR (Peak Signal-to-Noise Ratio)	Image	It is calculated between every frame of the original and the degraded video signal. PSNR is the most widely used objective image quality metric. However, PSNR values do not correlate well with perceived picture quality due to the complex, highly non-linear behaviour of the human visual system.
Full-Reference	SSIM (Structural SIMilarity)	Image	SSIM is a perception-based model that considers image degradation as perceived change in structural information, while also incorporating important perceptual phenomena, including both luminance masking and contrast masking terms.
Full-Reference	MOVIE Index (MOtion-based Video Integrity Evaluation)	Video	The MOVIE index is a neuroscience-based model for predicting the perceptual quality of a (possibly compressed or otherwise distorted) motion picture or video against a pristine reference video.
Full-Reference	VMAF (Video Multimethod Assessment Fusion)	Video	VMAF uses different features to predict video quality, which are fused using a SVM-based regression to provide a single output score. These scores are then temporally pooled over the entire video sequence using the arithmetic mean to provide an overall mean opinion score (MOS).
Full-Reference	NTIA Video Quality Metric (VQM)	Video	This model has been standardized in ITU-T Rec. J.144 in 2001. It is included in the 2004 edition of J.144 as "Annex D. National Telecommunications and Information Administration (NTIA) Video Quality Metric (VQM) technical description". J.144 also includes the following other full-reference metrics: BTFR (UK), Yonsei/SKT/RRL (Korea), CPqD (Brazil), along with two tables comparing their performance (page 5).
Reduced-Reference	SRR (SSIM Reduced-Reference)	Video	SRR value is calculated as the ratio of received (target) video signal SSIM with reference video pattern SSIM values.
Reduced-Reference	ST-RRED	Video	Compute wavelet coefficients of frame differences between the adjacent frames in a video sequence (modeled by a Gaussian Scale Mixture). It is used to evaluate RR entropic differences leading to temporal RRED.It in conjunction with spatial RRED indices evaluated by applying the RRED index on every frame of the video, yield the spatio-temporal RRED
Reduced-Reference	ITU-T Rec. P.1204.4	Video	This reduced-reference model compares features extracted from a reference video with a distorted (compressed video).
No-Reference	NIQE Naturalness Image Quality Evaluator	Image	This IQA model is founded on perceptually relevant spatial domain natural scene statistic (NSS) features extracted from local image patches that effectively capture the essential low-order statistics of natural images.
No-Reference	BRISQUE Blind/Referenceless Image Spatial Quality Evaluator	Image	The method extracts the pointwise statistics of local normalized luminance signals and measures image naturalness (or lack thereof) based on measured deviations from a natural image model. It also models the distribution of pairwise statistics of adjacent normalized luminance signals which provides distortion orientation information.
No-Reference	Video-BLIINDS	Video	Computes statistical models on DCT coefficients of frame differences and calculates motion characterization. Pedicts score based on those features using SVM.
No-Reference	ITU-T Rec. P.1203.1	Video	This is a metric that is part of the P.1203 family of standards, which can use either metadata only (codec, resolution, bitrate, framerate), frame information (frame types and sizes), or the entire bitstream to analyze the quality of a compressed video. It is primarily intended to be used in the context of HTTP adaptive streaming.
No-Reference	ITU-T Rec. P.1204.3	Video	This model uses the video bitstream to analyze compression/coding quality based on features like quantization parameters and motion vectors.
No-Reference	ITU-T Rec. P.1204.5	Video	This is a hybrid model that uses the decoded pixels and information about the video codec to determine final video quality.

=== Training and performance evaluation ===
Since objective video quality models are expected to predict results given by human observers, they are developed with the aid of subjective test results. During the development of an objective model, its parameters should be trained so as to achieve the best correlation between the objectively predicted values and the subjective scores, often available as mean opinion scores (MOS).

The most widely used subjective test materials are in the public domain and include still pictures, motion pictures, streaming video, high definition, 3-D (stereoscopic), and special-purpose picture quality-related datasets. These so-called databases are created by various research laboratories around the world. Some of them have become de facto standards, including several public-domain subjective picture quality databases created and maintained by the Laboratory for Image and Video Engineering (LIVE) as well the Tampere Image Database 2008. A collection of databases can be found in the QUALINET Databases repository. The Consumer Digital Video Library (CDVL) hosts freely available video test sequences for model development.

Some databases also provide pre-computed metric scores to allow others to benchmark new metrics against existing ones. Examples can be seen in the table below

Examples of Video Model Benchmark Databases
Benchmark	Number of videos	Number of metrics	Type of metrics
LIVE-VQC	585	11	No-reference
KoNViD-1k	1,200	11	No-reference
YouTube-UGC	1,500	9	No-reference
MSU No-Reference VQA	2,500	15	No-reference
MSU Full-Reference VQA	2,500	44	Full-reference
LIVE-FB Large-Scale Social Video Quality	39,000	6	No-reference
LIVE-ETRI	437	5	No-reference
LIVE Livestream	315	3	No-reference

In theory, a model can be trained on a set of data in such a way that it produces perfectly matching scores on that dataset. However, such a model will be over-trained and will therefore not perform well on new datasets. It is therefore advised to validate models against new data and use the resulting performance as a real indicator of the model's prediction accuracy.

To measure the performance of a model, some frequently used metrics are the linear correlation coefficient, Spearman's rank correlation coefficient, and the root mean square error (RMSE). Other metrics are the kappa coefficient and the outliers ratio. ITU-T Rec. P.1401 gives an overview of statistical procedures to evaluate and compare objective models.

=== Uses and application of objective models ===
Objective video quality models can be used in various application areas. In video codec development, the performance of a codec is often evaluated in terms of PSNR or SSIM. For service providers, objective models can be used for monitoring a system. For example, an IPTV provider may choose to monitor their service quality by means of objective models, rather than asking users for their opinion, or waiting for customer complaints about bad video quality. Few of these standards have found commercial applications, including PEVQ and VQuad-HD. SSIM is also part of a commercially available video quality toolset (SSIMWAVE). VMAF is used by Netflix to tune their encoding and streaming algorithms, and to quality-control all streamed content. It is also being used by other technology companies like Bitmovin and has been integrated into software such as FFmpeg.

An objective model should only be used in the context that it was developed for. For example, a model that was developed using a particular video codec is not guaranteed to be accurate for another video codec. Similarly, a model trained on tests performed on a large TV screen should not be used for evaluating the quality of a video watched on a mobile phone.

=== Other approaches ===
When estimating quality of a video codec, all the mentioned objective methods may require repeating post-encoding tests in order to determine the encoding parameters that satisfy a required level of visual quality, making them time consuming, complex and impractical for implementation in real commercial applications. There is ongoing research into developing novel objective evaluation methods which enable prediction of the perceived quality level of the encoded video before the actual encoding is performed.

== Subjective video quality ==
The main goal of many-objective video quality metrics is to automatically estimate the average user's (viewer's) opinion on the quality of a video processed by a system. Procedures for subjective video quality measurements are described in ITU-R recommendation BT.500 and ITU-T recommendation P.910. In such tests, video sequences are shown to a group of viewers. The viewers' opinion is recorded and averaged into the mean opinion score to evaluate the quality of each video sequence. However, the testing procedure may vary depending on what kind of system is tested.

== Tools for video quality assessment ==
Tool	Description	Аvailability	License	Included metrics
FFmpeg	Free and open-source multimedia tool that incorporates some video quality metrics	Free	Open source	PSNR, SSIM, VMAF
MSU VQMT	A software suite for objective video quality assessment (full reference and no reference)	Free for basic metrics Paid for HDR metrics	Proprietary	PSNR, SSIM, MS-SSIM, 3SSIM, VMAF, NIQE, VQM, Delta, MSAD, MSE MSU developed metrics: Blurring Metric, Blocking Metric, Brightness Flicking Metric, Drop Frame Metric, Noise Estimation Metric
EPFL VQMT	Various metrics implemented in OpenCV (C++) based on existing MATLAB implementations	Free	Open source	PSNR, PSNR-HVS, PSNR-HVS-M, SSIM, MS-SSIM, VIFp
OpenVQ	A toolkit implementing various metrics including the authors' OPVQ	Free	Open source	PSNR, SSIM, OPVQ
Elecard	A commercial video quality estimation program	Demo version available	Proprietary	PSNR, APSNR, MSAD, MSE, SSIM, Delta, VQM, NQI, VMAF, VIF
AviSynth	A video processing tool that can be used as a plugin or via scription	Free	Open source	SSIM
VQ Probe	A software to calculate video quality metrics	Free	Proprietary	PSNR, SSIM, VMAF
vmaf.dev	An online video quality calculation software implementing VMAF	Free	Open source	VMAF

== See also ==
- Glossary of video terms
- MDI
- Mean opinion score
- MOVIE Index
- PSNR
- SSIM
- Subjective video quality
- Video codecs
- VMAF
- Visual information fidelity
