= IABM =

The International Trade Association for Broadcast & Media Technology (IABM) is a non-profit trade organization, formerly known as International Association of Broadcasting Manufacturers, is the International Association for Broadcast & Media Technology Suppliers whose members represent over 80% of the broadcast and entertainment technology market's revenues. IABM facilitates the important networking and interaction between suppliers that shape and define the unique ecosystem of the broadcast and media technology industry.
