= VQuad-HD =

Video quality testing technology

VQuad-HD (Objective perceptual multimedia video quality measurement of HDTV) is a video quality testing technology for high definition video signals. It is a full-reference model, meaning that it requires access to the original and the degraded signal to estimate the quality.

== History ==
The VQuad-HD algorithm was developed by Swissqual in 2008–2010. It was the best performing model in the HDTV competition to find the new standard that was organized by the independent and non-commercial Video Quality Expert Group (VQEG). VQEG then proposed the VQuad-HD model to ITU-T to form a video quality model standard – known as ITU-T J.341 – which was released in January 2011.

== Applications scope ==
The ITU-T J.341 Recommendation provides a perceptual video quality measurement method for use in High-definition television (HDTV) non-interactive applications when the full reference (FR) measurement method can be used. The full reference measurement method can be used when the unimpaired reference video signal is readily available at the measurement point, as may be the case of measurements on individual equipment or a chain in the laboratory or in a closed environment such as a cable television head end. The estimation method includes both calibration and objective video quality estimations.

There are four major areas where this model can be applied:

1. Potentially real-time, in-service quality monitoring at the source.
2. Remote destination quality monitoring when a copy of the source is available at the point of measurement.
3. Quality measurement for monitoring of a storage or transmission system that utilizes Video compression and decompression techniques, either a single pass or a concatenation of such techniques.
4. Lab testing of video systems.

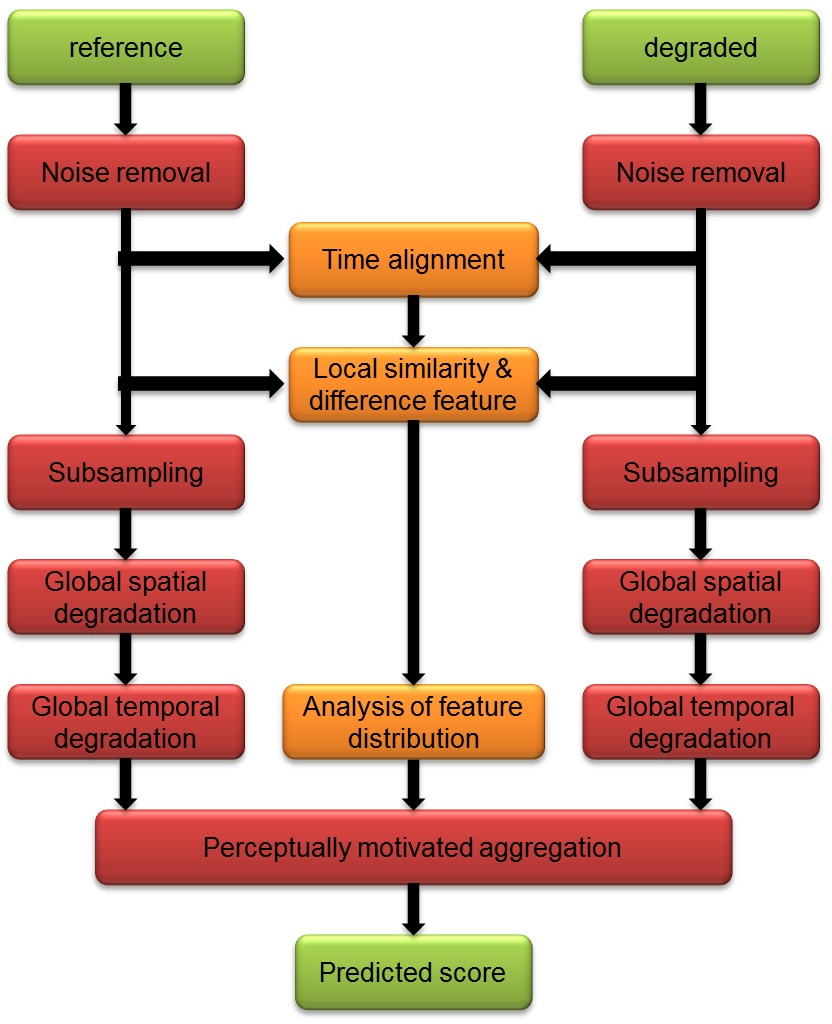
VQuad-HD flowchart

== Overview of the model ==
The model predicts the video quality as it is perceived by subjects (viewers). The prediction model uses psycho-visual and cognitive inspired modelling to emulate subjective perception. It compares the high quality reference video and the associated degraded video sequence under test. The estimation process is based on the following steps:

1. Preprocessing of the video sequences in particular, noise removal and sub-sampling
2. Temporal and spatial alignment between reference and processed video sequence
3. Analysis of the local similarity and difference feature
4. Computation of the global spatial degradation
5. Evaluation of the global temporal degradation by evaluating motion intensity
6. The quality score MOS is estimated based on a non-linear aggregation of the above features

== Video formats/codecs ==
The objective model is tested on a wide variety of different frame-rates as used in TV applications (29.97 fps and 25 fps), in Interlaced video and Progressive scan mode at the resolution 1920⨉1080. Content of 1280⨉720 was included in testing by up-sampling it to 1920⨉1080, as this is the typical case for most consumer applications. Content with 24 fps was included in testing but re-played at 25 fps.

Videos encoded by H.264/MPEG-4 AVC using either high or main profile, or MPEG-2 are supported. This objective model is deemed appropriate for telecommunication services delivered at between 1 and 30 MBit/s.

== Transmission impairments ==
The types of errors handled by model include packet errors (both IP and MPEG transport stream) such as Packet loss, Packet delay variation, Jitter, overflow and underflow, bit errors, and over-the-air transmission errors.

== See also ==
- Mean opinion score
- Video quality
- Video codecs
- H.264/MPEG-4 AVC
