= Peak signal-to-noise ratio =

Metric used to measure signal quality

Peak signal-to-noise ratio (PSNR) is an engineering term for the ratio between the maximum possible power of a signal and the power of corrupting noise that affects the fidelity of its representation. Because many signals have a very wide dynamic range, PSNR is usually expressed as a logarithmic quantity using the decibel scale.

PSNR is commonly used to quantify reconstruction quality for images and video subject to lossy compression. In this context it is used as a full reference metric, comparing a noisy approximation against the known noise-free source image.

== Definition ==
PSNR is most easily defined via the mean squared error (MSE). Given a noise-free m×n monochrome image I and its noisy approximation K, MSE is defined as

$$\mathit{MSE} = \frac{1}{m\,n}\sum_{i=0}^{m-1}\sum_{j=0}^{n-1} [I(i,j) - K(i,j)]^2.$$

The PSNR (in dB) is defined as

$$\begin{align}
\mathit{PSNR} &= 10 \cdot \log_{10} \left( \frac{\mathit{MAX}_I^2}{\mathit{MSE}} \right) \\
&= 20 \cdot \log_{10} \left( \frac{\mathit{MAX}_I}{\sqrt{\mathit{MSE}}} \right) \\
&= 20 \cdot \log_{10}(\mathit{MAX}_I) - 10 \cdot \log_{10} (\mathit{MSE}).
\end{align}$$

Here, MAX_{I} is the maximum possible pixel value of the image. When the pixels are represented using 8 bits per sample, this is 255. More generally, when samples are represented using linear PCM with B bits per sample, MAX_{I} is 2^{B} − 1.

=== Application in color images ===
For RGB color images, with three values per pixel, the definition of PSNR is the same except that the MSE is the sum over all squared value differences (now for each color, i.e. three times as many differences as in a monochrome image) divided by image size and by three. Alternately, for color images the image is converted to a different color space and PSNR is reported against each channel of that color space, e.g., YCbCr or CIELAB.

== Quality estimation with PSNR ==
PSNR is most commonly used to measure the quality of reconstruction of lossy compression codecs (e.g., for image compression). The signal in this case is the original data, and the noise is the error introduced by compression. When comparing compression codecs, PSNR is an approximation to human perception of reconstruction quality.

Typical values for the PSNR in lossy image and video compression are between 30 and 50 dB, provided the bit depth is 8 bits, where higher is better. The processing quality of 12-bit images is considered high when the PSNR value is 60 dB or higher. For 16-bit data typical values for the PSNR are between 60 and 80 dB. Acceptable values for wireless transmission quality loss are considered to be about 20 dB to 25 dB.
The maximum PSNR for 8 bit is 48.131, for 10 bit is 60.198, for 12 bit is 72.245.

In the absence of noise, the two images I and K are identical, and thus the MSE is zero. In this case the PSNR is infinite (or undefined, see Division by zero).

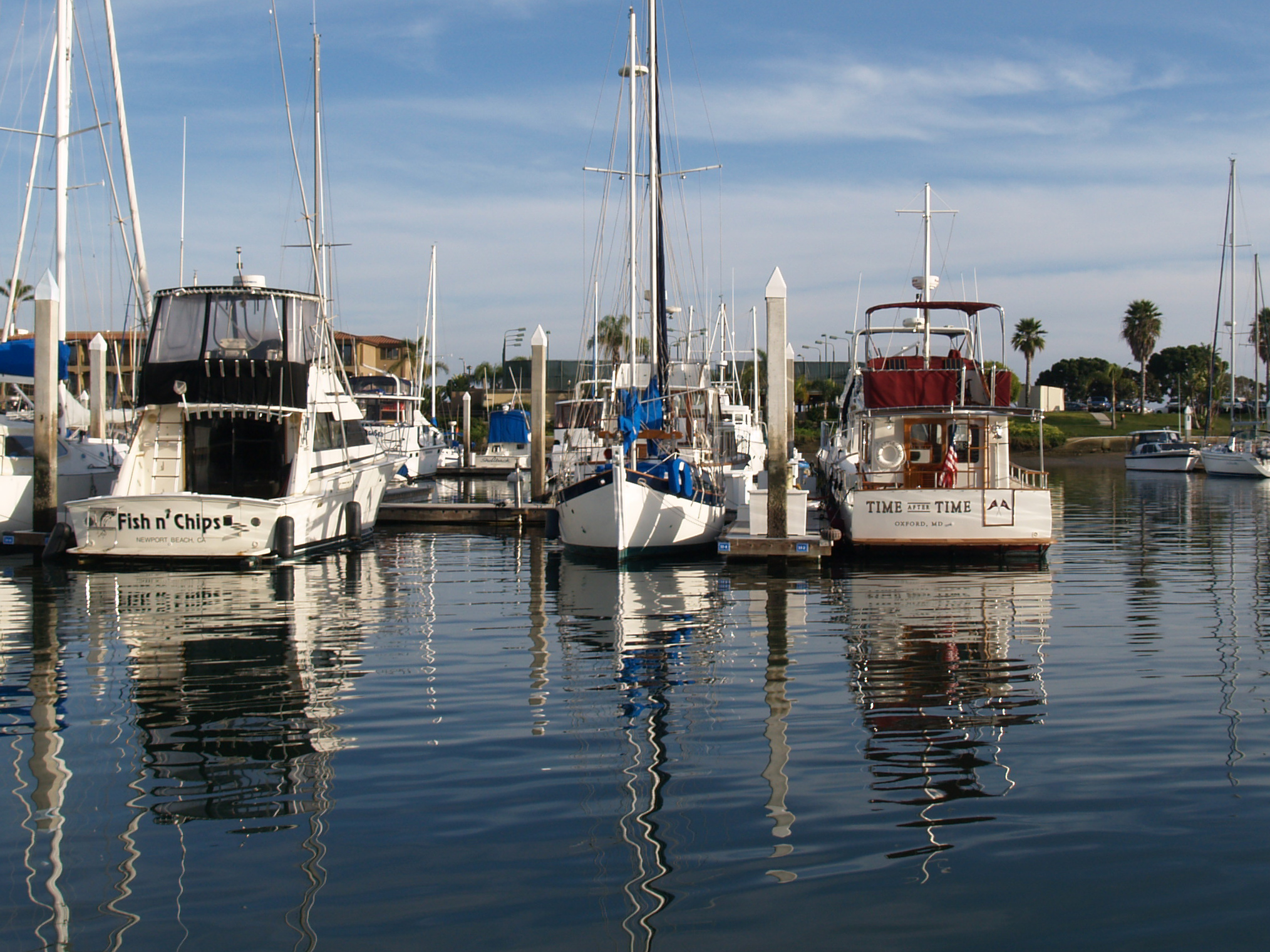
Original uncompressed image

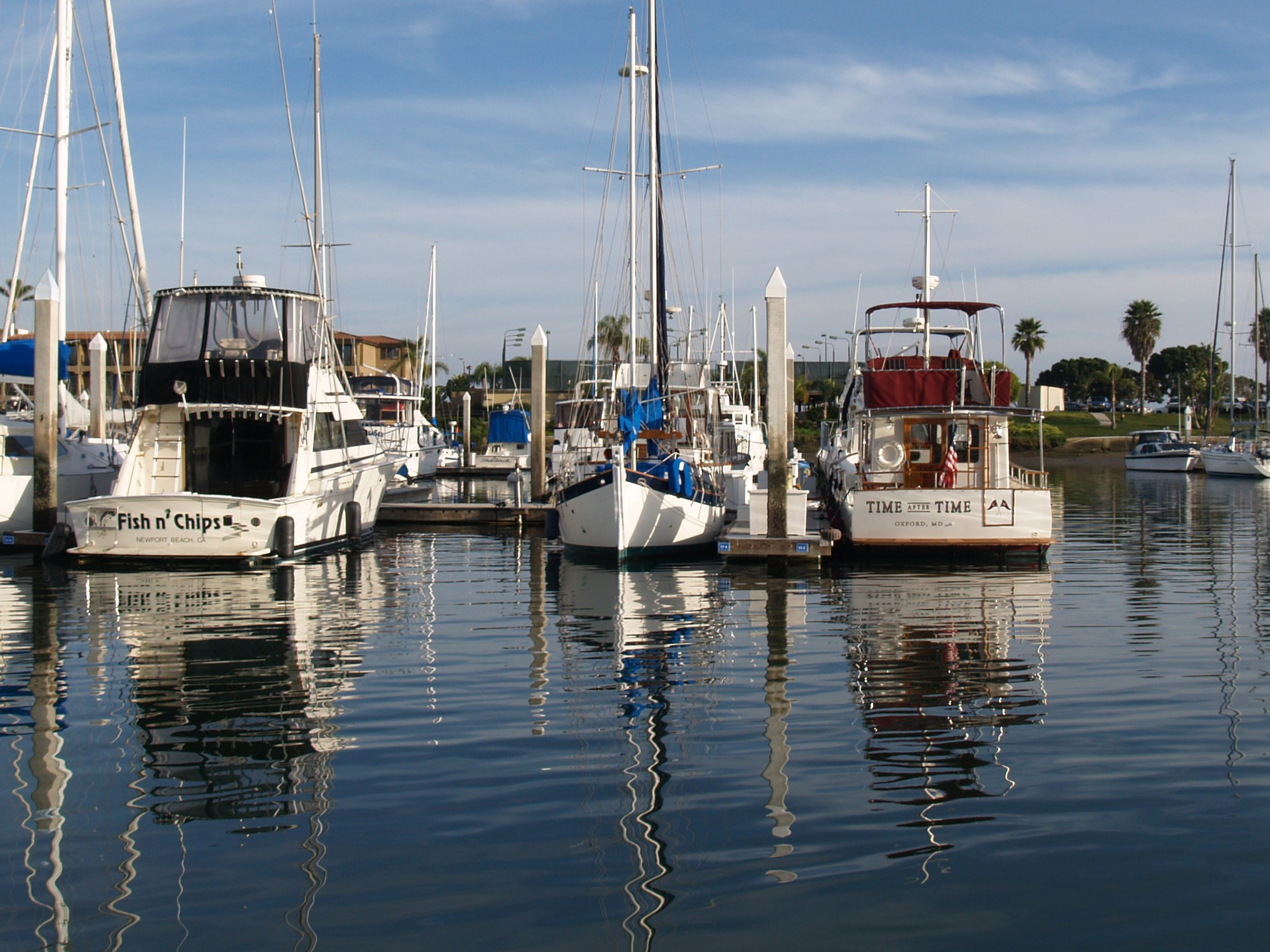
Q=90, PSNR 45.53dB

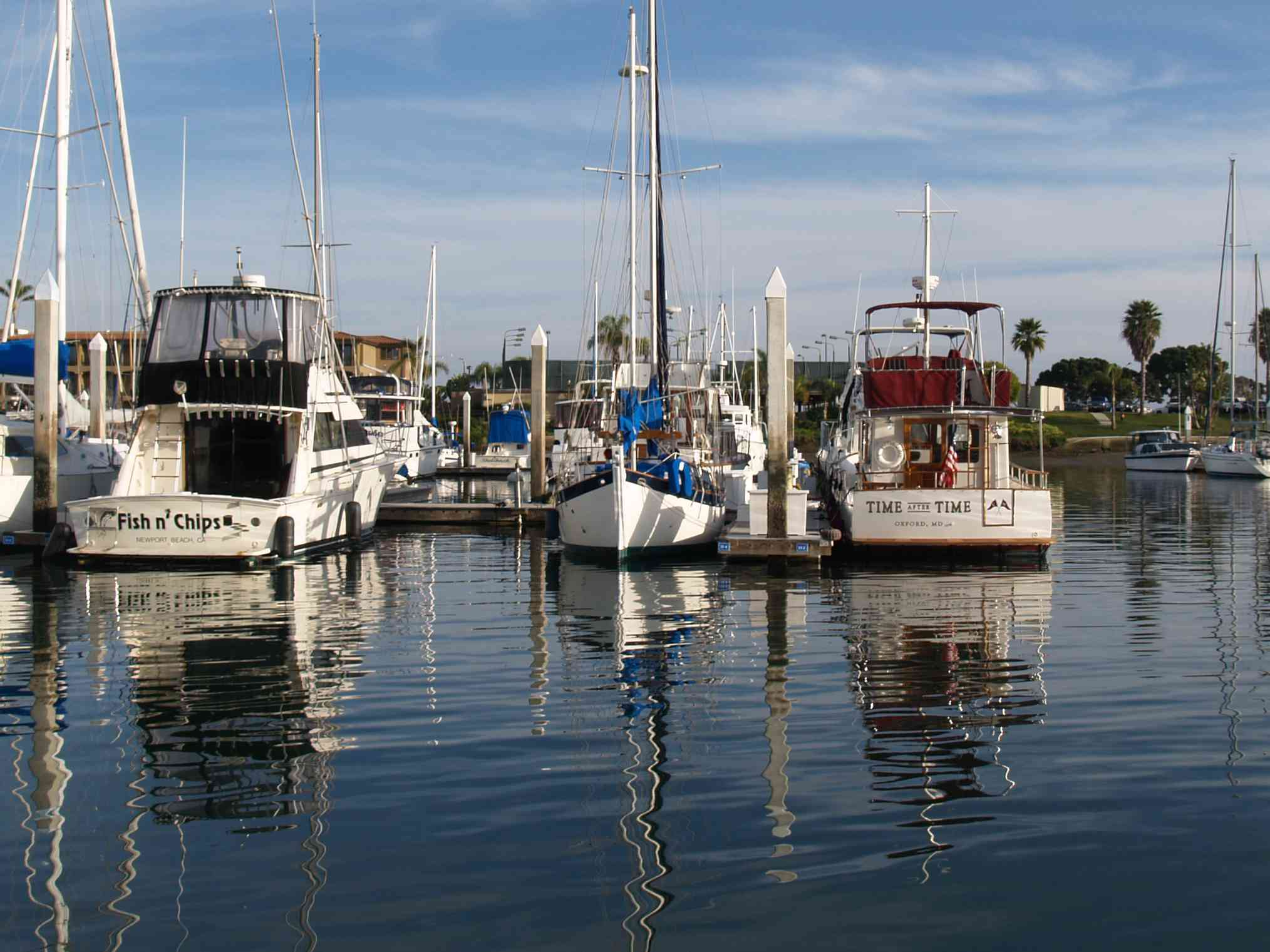
Q=30, PSNR 36.81dB

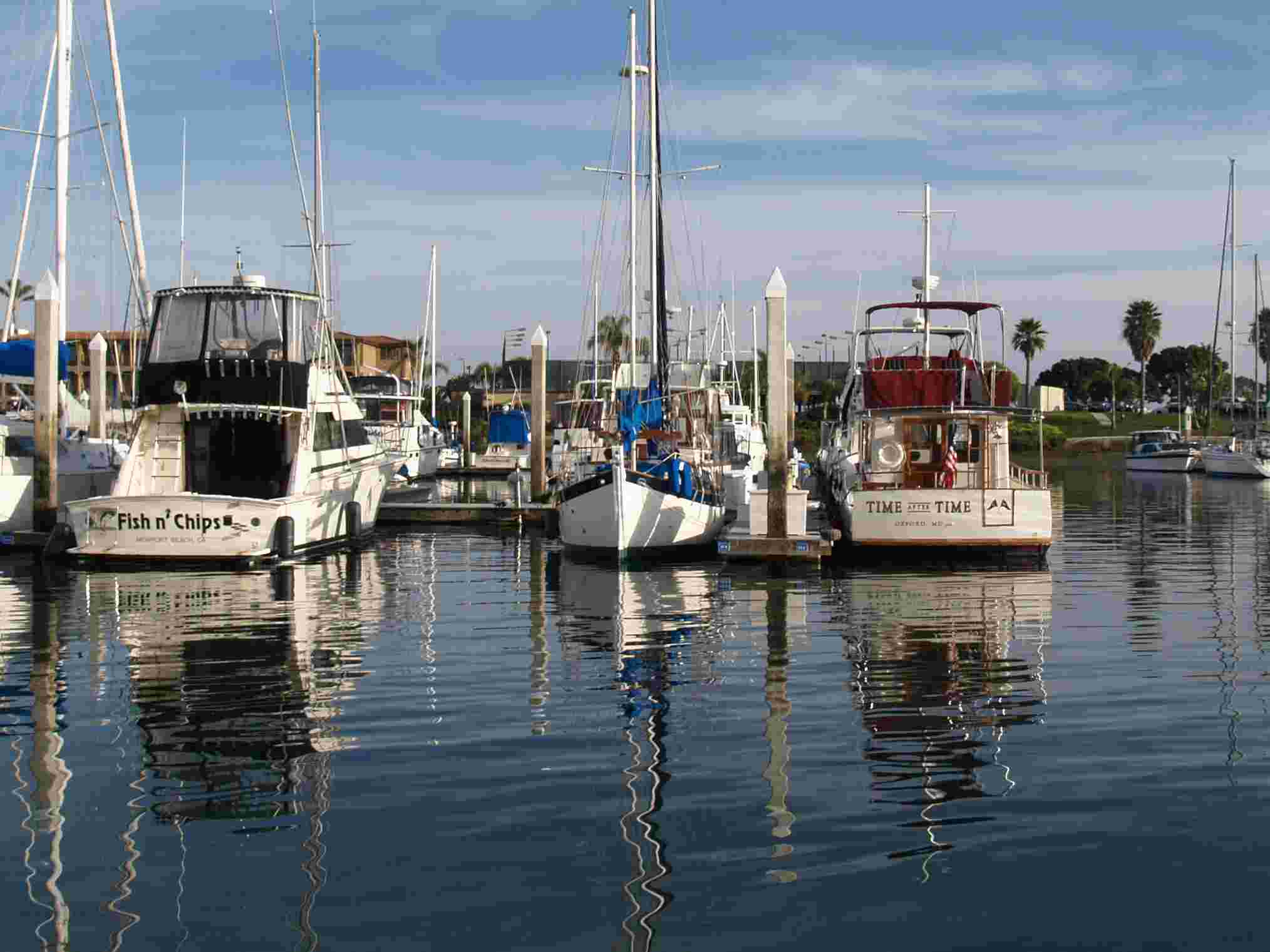
Q=10, PSNR 31.45dB

Example luma PSNR values for a cjpeg compressed image at various quality levels.

== Performance comparison ==
Although a higher PSNR generally correlates with a higher quality reconstruction, in many cases it may not. One has to be extremely careful with the range of validity of this metric; it is only conclusively valid when it is used to compare results from the same codec (or codec type) and same content.

Generally, when it comes to estimating the quality of images and videos as perceived by humans, PSNR has been shown to perform very poorly compared to other quality metrics.

== Variants ==
PSNR-HVS is an extension of PSNR that incorporates properties of the human visual system such as contrast perception.

PSNR-HVS-M improves on PSNR-HVS by additionally taking into account visual masking. In a 2007 study, it delivered better approximations of human visual quality judgements than PSNR and SSIM by large margin. It was also shown to have a distinct advantage over DCTune and PSNR-HVS.

ITU-T J.340 is intended for videos. It compensates for "for constant spatial shifts, constant temporal shift, and constant luminance gain and offset". The US NTIA has also published a variant for varying frame delays.

== See also ==
- Czekanowski distance
- Data compression ratio
- Perceptual Evaluation of Video Quality (PEVQ)
- Structural similarity index measure (SSIM)
- Subjective video quality
- Video Multimethod Assessment Fusion
- Video quality
