= Video Multimethod Assessment Fusion =

Objective full-reference video quality metric

Video Multimethod Assessment Fusion (VMAF) is an objective full-reference video quality metric developed by Netflix in cooperation with the University of Southern California, the IPI/LS2N lab Nantes Université, and the Laboratory for Image and Video Engineering (LIVE) at The University of Texas at Austin. It predicts subjective video quality based on a reference and distorted video sequence. The metric can be used to evaluate the quality of different video codecs, encoders, encoding settings, or transmission variants.

== History ==
The metric is based on initial work from the group of Professor C.-C. Jay Kuo at the University of Southern California. Here, the applicability of fusion of different video quality metrics using support vector machines (SVM) has been investigated, leading to a "FVQA (Fusion-based Video Quality Assessment) Index" that has been shown to outperform existing image quality metrics on a subjective video quality database.

The method has been further developed in cooperation with Netflix, using different subjective video datasets, including a Netflix-owned dataset ("NFLX"). Subsequently renamed "Video Multimethod Assessment Fusion", it was announced on the Netflix TechBlog in June 2016 and version 0.3.1 of the reference implementation was made available under a permissive open-source license.

In 2017, the metric was updated to support a custom model that includes an adaptation for cellular phone screen viewing, generating higher quality scores for the same input material. In 2018, a model that predicts the quality of up to 4K resolution content was released. The datasets on which these models were trained have not been made available to the public.

In 2021, a Technology and Engineering Emmy Award was awarded to Beamr, Netflix, University of Southern California, University of Nantes, The University of Texas at Austin, SSIMWAVE, Disney, Google, Brightcove and ATEME for the Development of Open Perceptual Metrics for Video Encoding Optimization. It was the second time in 20 years that universities got an Emmy Award. It was also the first time a French University got one.

In June 2026, Netflix announced VMAF v1, a major new release of the metric. The update addressed issues with the original version, including a tendency to favor compression artifacts over downscaling, as well as the inability to detect banding artifacts. VMAF v1 has models covering 1080p, mobile phone, and 4K viewing scenarios, with separate models for near and typical 4K viewing distances. Netflix also announced a future HDR version they are working on.

== Components ==
VMAF uses existing image quality metrics, which are fused by a machine-learning model into a single quality score.

Since version 1, the metric uses the following features:

- Detail Loss Metric (DLM): measures loss of details, and impairments which distract viewer attention
- Contrast Aware Multiscale Banding Index (CAMBI): detects banding artifacts in smooth regions
- A chroma feature based on a modified version of SpEED-QA
- Mean Co-Located Pixel Difference (MCPD): measures temporal difference between frames on the luminance component

The above features are fused using a SVM-based regression to provide a single output score in the range of 0–100 per video frame, with 100 being quality identical to the reference video. These scores are then temporally pooled over the entire video sequence using the arithmetic mean to provide an overall differential mean opinion score (DMOS). To handle 4K viewing distances, v1 adjusts the feature values according to the normalized viewing distance, so that a single model can be retrained and reapplied.

Also, as of v1, the No-Enhancement Gain (NEG) variant is enabled by default. It prevents the score from being artificially inflated on some visual enhancement techniques.

v1 removed the Visual Information Fidelity (VIF) feature to reduce computational cost.

Due to the public availability of the training source code ("VMAF Development Kit", VDK), the fusion method can be re-trained and evaluated based on different video datasets and features.

=== Original version ===
The original version of VMAF, released in 2016, fused a different set of features using a support-vector-machine (SVM)-based regression:

- Visual Information Fidelity (VIF): considers information fidelity loss at four different spatial scales
- Detail Loss Metric (DLM): measures loss of details, and impairments which distract viewer attention
- Mean Co-Located Pixel Difference (MCPD): measures temporal difference between frames on the luma component

Anti-noise signal-to-noise ratio (AN-SNR) was used in even earlier versions of VMAF as a quality metric but was subsequently abandoned.

== Performance ==
An early version of VMAF has been shown to outperform other image and video quality metrics such as SSIM, PSNR-HVS and VQM-VFD on three of four datasets in terms of prediction accuracy, when compared to subjective ratings. Its performance has also been analyzed in another paper, which found that VMAF did not perform better than SSIM and MS-SSIM on a video dataset. In 2017, engineers from RealNetworks reported good reproducibility of Netflix' performance findings. In the MSU video quality metrics benchmark, where its various versions (including VMAF NEG) were tested, VMAF outperformed all other metrics on all compression standards (H.265, VP9, AV1, VVC).

VMAF scores can be artificially increased without improving perceived quality by applying various operations before or after distorting the video, sometimes without impacting the popular PSNR metric.

== Software ==
A reference implementation written in C and Python ("VMAF Development Kit, VDK") is published as free software under the terms of BSD+Patent license. Its source code and additional material are available on GitHub.

== See also ==
- Perceptual Evaluation of Video Quality (PEVQ)
- VQuad-HD
