= Digital Entertainment Content Ecosystem =

Film industry consortium

The Digital Entertainment Content Ecosystem (DECE, LLC.) was a consortium of major film studios, consumer electronics manufacturers and retailers, networking hardware vendors, systems integrators, and digital rights management (DRM) vendors listed below. The consortium was announced in September 2008 by its president, Mitch Singer, who was also the chief technology officer (CTO) of Sony Pictures Entertainment at the time. DECE was chartered to develop a set of standards for the digital distribution of premium Hollywood content. The consortium created a set of rules and a back-end system for the management of those rules that enabled consumers to share purchased digital content among a domain of registered consumer electronics devices.

DECE's digital locker system was named UltraViolet.

Amazon, Apple, Disney, and Google were not members of DECE. In February 2014, Disney launched its own digital locker system named Keychest and an associated streaming platform named Disney Movies Anywhere. In October 2017, Disney expanded Keychest to outside studios and renamed Disney Movies Anywhere to Movies Anywhere. Movies Anywhere currently connects to Amazon Video, FandangoNOW, Google Play/YouTube, Apple TV/iTunes, Microsoft Movies & TV, Vudu, Verizon Fios, and Xfinity.

On January 30, 2019, after servicing more than 30 million users with over 300 million pieces of TV and movie content, Variety reported the closure of the UltraViolet system on July 31, 2019; DECE recommended confirming connections of UltraViolet content to Vudu and FandangoNow in the US and connections to Flixster outside the US before the service's closure to maintain existing digital rights. DECE, LLC as an entity officially dissolved in August 2020.

== Members ==
DECE members included:

- Adobe Systems
- Akamai Technologies
- Alcatel Lucent
- Arxan Technologies
- Best Buy
- BluFocus Inc.
- British Sky Broadcasting
- British Telecom
- castLabs
- Catch Media
- Cineplex Entertainment
- CinemaNow
- Cisco
- Comcast (Including NBCUniversal)
- Cox Communications
- CSG Systems' Content Direct
- Deluxe Digital
- Dolby Laboratories
- DTS (sound system)
- FandangoNOW
- FilmFlex
- Fox Entertainment Group
- Fujitsu
- Hewlett Packard
- Huawei Technologies
- IBM
- Intel
- Kaleidescape
- Lionsgate
- Motorola Mobility
- Nagravision
- NDS Group
- NeuMovie
- Neustar
- Nokia
- PacketVideo
- Panasonic
- Paramount Pictures
- Royal Philips Electronics
- QuickPlay Media
- RIAA
- Red Bee Media
- Rovi Corporation
- Saffron Digital
- Samsung Electronics
- SeaChange International
- Secure Path Technology
- Sonic Solutions
- Sony Corporation
- Switch Communications
- TalkTalk
- Technicolor
- Testronic Labs
- Toggle
- Toshiba
- Verance
- Verimatrix
- VeriSign Inc.
- Verizon Communications, Inc.
- Vubiquity
- Vudu
- Warner Bros. Entertainment
- Widevine Technologies
