= Next wave =

Next wave or The Next Wave may refer to

== Books ==
- Nextwave, a humorous comic book series by Warren Ellis and Stuart Immonen, published by Marvel Comics between 2006 and 2007
- The Next Wave (book), a book by Darrell M. West

== Film and TV ==
- The Next Wave (TV series), science interview program hosted by Leonard Nimoy
- Love Boat: The Next Wave, revival of the original 1977–1986 ABC sitcom
- War of the Worlds 2: The Next Wave, 2008 direct-to-DVD science fiction film

== Music ==
- Next Wave Festival biennial festival based in Melbourne, Australia
- BAM Next Wave Festival in New York City, see Brooklyn Academy of Music
- Next Wave Jazz Ensemble, musical ensemble based at the United States Naval Academy
- Next Wave (album), 2003 house album by Mondo Grosso
- The Nextwave Sessions, EP by British indie rock band Bloc Party

== Other ==
- NextWave Wireless, wireless technology company that produces mobile multimedia
