= Van Wie =

Van Wie or Vanwie or variation, may refer to:

- Van Wie Creek, a tributary of the Mohawk River in New York State, US

== People ==
- David Van Wie (born 1964) U.S. inventor
- Derrick Van Wie, a member of the hardcore band One King Down
- Joel VanWie, a member of the pop-punk band The Last Sleepless City
- Virginia Van Wie (1909-1997) U.S. golfer

== See also ==
- Wie (disambiguation)
- Van (disambiguation)
- Van Wieren, a surname
