= Yashahime season 1 =

Yashahime: Princess Half-Demon
- Season 1
- Cover art of the first home media box set released by Aniplex in Japan.
- No. of episodes: 24

Release
- Original network: NNS (ytv)
- Original release: October 3, 2020 – March 20, 2021

Season chronology
- Next → Season 2: The Second Act

Yashahime: Princess Half-Demon is a Japanese anime television series produced by Sunrise that serves as a sequel to Rumiko Takahashi's Inuyasha series. It was first announced in May 2020 and was directed by Teruo Sato with main character designs by Takahashi. Most of the main cast and staff have returned, with Katsuyuki Sumisawa in charge of the scripts, Yoshihito Hishinuma in charge of the anime character designs and Kaoru Wada composing the music. The sequel series is set after Inuyasha and his allies destroyed Naraku and the Shikon Jewel. The trio of family daughters began their journey keeping all Rainbow Pearls from villainous siblings. It aired from October 3, 2020, to March 20, 2021, on both Yomiuri TV and Nippon TV. The opening theme "New Era" is performed by the male idol group SixTones, and the ending theme "Break" is performed by Uru. The second opening theme "Burn" is performed by NEWS, and the second ending theme "Kesshō" is performed by Ryokuōshoku Shakai.

Viz Media announced it had acquired the rights to digital streaming, electronic sell-through (EST), and home video releases of the series for North and Latin American territories. Medialink also announced that it has the rights to the series in Southeast Asian and South Asian territories. Viz Media streamed the series on Crunchyroll, Funimation, and Hulu. On October 26, 2020, Funimation announced a partnership with Viz Media to release an English dub of the series, with most of the English cast of Inuyasha reprising their roles. The English dub of the series aired on Adult Swim's Toonami programming block on June 27, 2021.

== Episode list ==
No. overall	No. in season	Title (Note: All English episode titles taken from Crunchyroll.)	Directed by	Written by	Storyboarded by	Original release date	English air date	Ref.
1	1	"Inuyasha: Since Then"; Transliteration: "Are kara no Inuyasha" (Japanese: あれからの犬夜叉)	Teruo Satō	Katsuyuki Sumisawa	Teruo Satō	October 3, 2020	June 27, 2021	
Towa Higurashi was captured and interrogated by a feudal lord for future possessions, including a book of Reiwa era and the seat from Kagome's bicycle. She does not comply, certain that sharing info from the future will alter the past. The story shifts back to fourteen years ago with Kagome and her friends living in the feudal era. Inuyasha and Miroku meet the Root Head, a demon whom Kikyō sealed many decades ago. The Root Head attacks Kagome, but Inuyasha destroys it, though a small part of the demon has survived. Back in the present day, Towa is rescued by her twin sister Setsuna and their cousin Moroha, who identify the lord attendant as the ayakashi Yotsume in disguise, and follow it. Before leaving, Towa keeps the items.
2	2	"The Three Princesses"; Transliteration: "Sanbiki no Hime" (Japanese: 三匹の姫)	Katsuya Ōshima	Katsuyuki Sumisawa	Teruo Satō	October 10, 2020	July 4, 2021	
As children, Towa and Setsuna spent time in a forest, until a wildfire occurred. After leaving Setsuna behind, Towa gets dragged away by a portal and is stranded in the present day. She is adopted by Kagome's brother, Sōta. Ten years later, Towa defends herself from bullies and changes schools. Back in the past, the Demon Slayers, Hisui (the son of Sango and Miroku), Kohaku, and Setsuna, confront Moroha, mistaking her for a demon who attacked the locals, until Mistress Three-Eyes appears, and steals the Red and Gold Rainbow Pearls from Moroha and Setsuna. In the present day, Towa saves her adopted family from the bullies. That night, a portal opens, sending Setsuna, Moroha, and Mistress Three-Eyes to the present day, Towa recognizes Setsuna as a demon slayer. Sensing the Silver Rainbow Pearl, Mistress Three-Eyes breaks Towa's sword in half.
3	3	"The Dream Butterfly"; Transliteration: "Yume no Kochō" (Japanese: 夢の胡蝶)	Imugahi	Katsuyuki Sumisawa	Atsuo Tobe	October 17, 2020	July 11, 2021	
Towa uses her power within the hilt to convert the remains into a laser blade. Setsuna kills Mistress Three-Eyes and recovers the pearls. Towa tries to reacquaint with Setsuna, but she ignores her. Moroha deduces they are Sesshōmaru's daughters, but neither of them know who they are. Meanwhile, Kaede tells Hisui and Kohaku about Setsuna spending ten years alone without Towa. They found the roots around the Sacred Tree of Ages, and deduce Setsuna and Moroha trapped at the modern era. A minor demon called Hitōkon possesses Towa and has her attack Setsuna. After a brief fight, Hitōkon attempts to possess Mei, but Setsuna exorcises it. Towa's family allows Setsuna and Moroha to stay with them, and Sōta and Kagome's mother recognize Moroha. Moroha learns that Setsuna was cursed by the Dream Butterfly, and cannot rest without her memory. Towa is struck with guilt, believing she could have prevented this if they were united.
4	4	"The Gateway to the Past"; Transliteration: "Kako e no Tobira" (Japanese: 過去への扉)	Ryūta Kawahara	Katsuyuki Sumisawa	Teruo Satō	October 24, 2020	July 18, 2021	
The three girls plan to return to the past, capture the Dream Butterfly and restore Setsuna's ability. As they spend a few days in the modern world, Moroha discovers Root Head in the Tree of Ages and negotiates with him to reopen the portal in exchange for the Rainbow Pearls. Setsuna receives the violin and Moroha packs a giant bag of modern supplies. Towa bids farewell to her family and the three enter the portal. They are interrupted by the Spirit of the Tree of Ages, in the form of Kikyō. She asks them to stop Kirinmaru, an old rival of their paternal grandfather, Tōga, who plans to twist time. Sesshōmaru has renounced his title, resulting him being on the wrong path, but on the same one as Kirinmaru. The Sacred Tree of Ages ask for them to kill both at the same time. Setsuna refuses, saying she does not know about Sesshōmaru, while Towa plans to meet him. The spirit transports them to Root Head, who attacks them for the Pearls, but they defeat it, and arrive in the past to be greeted by Kaede, Kohaku, and Hisui. The girls cannot return to the modern world. Meanwhile, the Spirit of the Tree of Ages watches over the adult Rin, who is in suspended animation within the Sacred Tree, and tells Sesshōmaru if he forsakes her, she will not awaken.
5	5	"Jakotsumaru of the Red Bone Palace"; Transliteration: "Aka Hone Goten no Jakotsumaru" (Japanese: 赤骨御殿の若骨丸)	Sōta Yokote	Katsuyuki Sumisawa	Kazuo Terada	October 31, 2020	July 25, 2021	
The demon Jakotsumaru steals skeleton bodies, in order to revive his father Tōkotsu. Moroha retrieved the Red Rainbow Pearl from his corpse. After learning the situation, Kohaku sends Towa and Setsuna to deal with it, while Moroha plans to get a large reward for it to pay off her debts. Accompanied by Myōga, who reveals Tōkotsu is one of the Four Perils and siding with Kirinmaru, the girls discover the hideout and confront him. Towa finds Jakotsumaru "cute and naively", and thinks Moroha will apologize to him, but realizes she has to fight. Moroha uses her secret technique to awaken her demon blood, but falls unconscious. After Towa and Setsuna destroy Jakotsumaru and Tōkotsu, the palace vanishes without a trace. Knowing Moroha has lost the bounty, Setsuna expresses her interest.
6	6	"The Cat Juan at the Old Temple"; Transliteration: "Furudera no Neko Juan" (Japanese: 古寺の猫寿庵)	Yūki Morita	Katsuhiko Chiba	Teruo Satō	November 7, 2020	August 1, 2021	
The girls investigate the disappearances near a mountain pass when they meet a little girl left by her mother. After sending her back to the village, they learn that the villagers are being possessed by a horde of bakeneko and slays most of them, with the rest fleeing. Looking for clues about the disappearances, the girls arrive at a temple and meet the resident monk, Juan. Realizing that the bakeneko are hidden in the temple, they pretend to sleep and slay the demons after revealing themselves. They learn from Juan that a priest sealed a powerful demon beneath the temple a hundred years ago and Towa stays inside the temple to protect him, while the others look for the demon's remains until they find some old bones transforming into a huge bakeneko. Meanwhile, Towa is trapped inside the temple with the magical barrier by the real bakeneko, who reveals himself to be possessing Juan while the monster fighting outside is a construct made from the bones of the humans it devoured. Moroha destroys the barrier. After hearing from Myōga that Inuyasha used to defeat demons without killing their hosts by absorbing their powerful demonic abilities and energy into Tessaiga, Towa does the same, saving Juan and killing the Bakeneko. Note: This episode is based on a chapter from the original Inuyasha manga that was not adapted into The Final Act.
7	7	"Meeting through an Apple"; Transliteration: "Ringo no Deai" (Japanese: 林檎の出会い)	Tomo Ōkubo	Katsuyuki Sumisawa	Takahiro Ōkawa	November 14, 2020	August 15, 2021	
Kyūki informs Kirinmaru about the trio of Half-Demon Princesses. Kirinmaru commends Sesshōmaru's daughters for their success in slaying quite a formidable warrior that served under him, which he seemed to have forgotten somehow. Kyūki warns him that if he does not take action, she worries that the Half-Demon Princesses will surely bring him disaster. After participating with Kohaku's group, Towa and Setsuna accompany Kaede. The next day, Setsuna goes on a mission without Towa. Later, Towa searches for the Dream Butterfly, but has an encounter with the pirate Riku instead. Riku presents Towa with the real mystical Kikujūmonji sword that he stole from the nearby lord before leaving, and Towa is arrested for being mistaken for the real culprit, and is brought before the Lord and Yotsume, leading to the events of the series. Setsuna and Moroha are informed of the predicament. They confront Fubuki, an ice demon serving under Kyūki, another of Kirinmaru's Four Perils. While being confronted by Yotsume and the Lord, Towa notices Fubuki's true body and signals for Moroha to shoot it. Afterwards, Moroha and Setsuna storm the castle to save Towa, and they leave to follow Yotsume.
8	8	"The Dream Gazing Trap"; Transliteration: "Yume Hiraki no Wana" (Japanese: 夢ひらきの罠)	Megumi Yamamoto	Katsuyuki Sumisawa	Megumi Yamamoto	November 21, 2020	August 22, 2021	
Riku meets Jyūbei, who gives him a large sum of gold for his services and reveals that he intends to use the girls in his plan to defeat the remaining three Perils, so that he can obtain all seven Rainbow Pearls and gain untold demonic power. Meanwhile, the girls follow Yotsume to the hideout. Kyūki uses the Purple Rainbow Pearl to empower Yotsume. He puts Towa, Moroha, and Takechiyo to sleep. In their dreams, it is revealed that Kagome entrusted Moroha to Hachiemon, when the couple prepared to confront Kirinmaru and Sesshōmaru, Miroku entrusted Takechiyo to Jyūbei without a reason, and that the Dream Butterfly had carried Setsuna's memory to the Sacred Tree of Ages, where Rin is imprisoned. Setsuna, being incapable of sleep, resists the power and kills Yotsume. Kyūki reclaims the Pearl and confronts the girls, stealing Towa and Moroha's energy under the spell's influence. As Setsuna fights Kyūki alone, Moroha reminds Towa about her natural ability to steal demonic energy, and Towa uses it to fight and defeat Kyūki with the Sōryūha attack she inherited from her dog-demon father. Riku keeps the purple Rainbow Pearl, and Jyūbei introduces him to the girls as his and Takechiyo's employer, rewarding the money for them.
9	9	"Meifuku, the Meioju"; Transliteration: "Meiōjū no Meifuku" (Japanese: 冥王獣の冥福)	Mariachi HugYuk	Katsuhiko Chiba	Mariachi HugYuk	November 28, 2020	August 29, 2021	
Konton, one of the Four Perils, destroys a fortress atop a mountain to establish his lair. Jyūbei announces that there is a huge bounty on him and Moroha accepts the mission, but Towa and Setsuna refuse, until Jyūbei suggests that they should use the money as a reward for info about the Dream Butterfly. The girls notice Konton is wearing an armour. Meifuku, a Meiōjū child appears to rescue them. Meifuku reveals that Konton killed his father and used the part of his shell to make his armour. Since then he has searched for Konton in order to retrieve it and give his father a proper funeral. Konton attacks the group and Towa realizes that Konton created his armour by draining the demonic energy from the shell of Meifuku's father, returning it to normal and infusing it with energy. Without the armour, Konton flees. Meifuku returns his father's shell so that he can finally die, and the girls regret they could not get the bounty on the enemy, while Konton swears revenge.
10	10	"The Gold and Silver Rainbow Pearls"; Transliteration: "Kin to Gin no Nijiiro Shinju" (Japanese: 金と銀の虹色真珠)	Katsuya Ōshima	Junki Takegami	Katsuya Ōshima	December 5, 2020	September 5, 2021	
The twin brothers Kinka and Ginka, share the same body, but they fight each other so one will defeat the other and claim a single body. Towa, Setsuna, and Moroha are sent to stop the damage they are causing to nearby villages and attack them. Noticing Towa and Setsuna are keeping the Rainbow Pearls, Kinka and Ginka hold a truce so they can steal the pearls from them. They possess Towa and Setsuna, forcing them to fight each other, until Setsuna uses the poison to expel them, but they steal the pearls and retreat. The brothers report their feat to Joka, their clan's leader, who decides to absorb both while claiming the pearls for herself as part of her plan to get revenge on Sesshōmaru. Towa and Setsuna arrive to retrieve the Pearls when Setsuna, watching the brothers in peril, has some glimpses of the day when she got separated from her own twin sister. After Joka separates Kinka from Ginka to absorb him first, Ginka joins forces with Setsuna to defeat her, but Kinka does not survive the attack, with Ginka dying soon after. The sisters regain their Rainbow Pearls, and Towa wonders if Setsuna remembered the past. Moroha discovers her enemies turned to ashes and loses the reward.
11	11	"Curse of the Man-Eating Pond"; Transliteration: "Hito Kui-numa no Noroi" (Japanese: 人喰い沼の呪い)	Ayumu Ono	Hiroko Kanasugi	Ayumu Ono	December 12, 2020	September 12, 2021	
Moroha notices a bird being swallowed up by a pond of murky green water, but Towa and Setsuna do not believe her and leave. They talk to Hisui and Kohaku, who concur that the pond is indeed inhabited by something devouring anyone who come near it. Seeing that Moroha was telling the truth, the half-demon twins leave to investigate the pond. They arrive, and Setsuna stops Hikoumaru from arguing with his sister Chiyo, when the siblings approach the pond and attempt to avenge their parents. Towa scolds the boy for hurting the girl and states that he would regret letting go of her. Back at Jyūbei's house, Moroha cleans the room and Takechiyo scolds her that it is the least she can do to pay off her debt. Hikomaru and Chiyo take Towa and Setsuna to their home, where they are raised by their grandmother. She explains that the pond had been murky ever since she was a child but was once as clear as a mirror. Hikoumaru and Chiyo reveal that the "something" that has inhabited the pond is called Venom Serpent. The siblings discover the violin, remembering that their father had played the Biwa near the pond before he died. Setsuna plays the violin, but makes them sad. After a delicious meal, Towa and Setsuna are invited to stay the night. Towa wakes up and joins Setsuna outside the hut. She apologizes for accidental sleeping. Setsuna brushes her apology off. Towa firmly assures Setsuna that she will find the Dream Butterfly. Setsuna simply says that her inability to sleep has been happening since she can remember and that it has not been a hardship for her. She tells Towa to sleep, as they have a job slaying the Venom Serpent that has been inhabiting the pond for decades.
12	12	"Night of the New Moon and the Black-haired Towa"; Transliteration: "Saku no Yoru, Kurokami no Towa" (Japanese: 朔の夜、黒髪のとわ)	Yōji Satō, Kento Matsui	Junki Takegami, Katsuyuki Sumisawa	Kazuo Terada	December 19, 2020	September 19, 2021	
Konton assigns Nikosen, a sage-turned-apparition demon, to attack the Half-Demon Princesses and steal the Rainbow Pearls. At the village, Towa and Setsuna accepts the mission of slaying Nikosen from Kohaku while Moroha helps local villagers in destroying the demon for the bounty. Towa and Setsuna come to join her, but are attacked by Nikosen who demands the rainbow pearls they possess. Towa joins the battle, but her energy blade does not form, which concerns her and puzzles Setsuna, as she can hear her heartbeat louder than she should. Moroha tries to use Kurikaramaru, but cannot damage Nikosen. In retaliation, Nikosen breathes poison and weakens Towa. Setsuna gives her a poison-shielding mask and tells Moroha to take care of Towa while she fights the demon. Moroha notices that Towa's hair colour turned black, before Nikosen destroys the bridge. In midair on Kiara, Setsuna attacks an illusion of Nioksen which is undo by the assistance of Hisui and his fellow Demon-Slayers. At the cave, Moroha learns from Myōga that Towa became the next person to lose her powers on the night of the new moon like Inuyasha. Towa is concerned that Setsuna has experienced the exact same transformation and wants to go find her. Moroha infuses her spiritual powers into sutras to erect a blue sacred barrier and prevent Nikosen from approaching them. As Setsuna retains her full abilities, Moroha deduces that because her memories were taken from her by the Dream Butterfly, the laws of the new moon no longer apply to her. Taking advantage of the fact, Setsuna distracts Nikosen. However, daybreak comes and restores Towa's dog-demon abilities, allowing her to kill Nikosen. Having witnessed the whole battle in fire he created, Konton states how good a show it was and smiles in satisfaction, now aware of their weakness.
13	13	"The Delicious Feudal Monks"; Transliteration: "Sengoku Oishii Hōshi" (Japanese: 戦国おいしい法師)	Kento Nakagomi	Katsuhiko Chiba	Katsumi Ono	December 26, 2020	September 26, 2021	
Tōtetsu, the last member of the Four Perils, is eating virtuous monks to increase his demon power, even though he possesses the orange Rainbow Pearl. Taking heed of this, Kohaku sends Hisui, Towa and Setsuna to protect his brother-in-law Miroku, who participates in a 1000-day training course to increase his spiritual powers tremendously, while Moroha is assigned by Jyūbei to protect another monk. Hisui is dissatisfied at first about Miroku, as he does not approve his behavior. They meet Hisui's older sister Gyokuto, who visits Miroku. Tōtetsu appears and attacks Miroku. While protecting him, Hisui inadvertently swallows the poison they used on Tōtetsu, while the sisters distract the enemy, while Miroku tends to him. Knowing that they are having disadvantage, Setsuna asks Miroku to undo the seal he put on her to restrain her demonic blood, which unlocks her true powers, before Tōtetsu flees. Miroku restores the seal afterwards and Hisui starts seeing his father in a better light. Hisui informs his mother Sango about Miroku and Moroha searches for a bounty.
14	14	"The One Behind the Forest Fire"; Transliteration: "Mori o Yaita Kuromaku" (Japanese: 森を焼いた黒幕)	Ryō Kodama	Hiroko Kanasugi	Yoshiyuki Kaneko	January 9, 2021	October 3, 2021	
Towa, Setsuna, and Moroha meet Tamano, a beautiful young woman whom Riku rescued. They learn from Tamano that Homura is the mountain god who had abducted Tamano from her grandparents' house. Homura kills all men for glancing at Tamano. During their confrontation, Homura recognizes Towa and Setsuna, revealing he was the one who behind the forest fire. He attempts to cover for his failure by killing them, when Riku arrives with Tamano by her request. Tamano rejects Homura for his behavior and declares that she will never return to his side. Disheartened and because he cannot bear to live without her, Homura kills himself. Riku gloats about Homura, stating to himself how loving a human being only leads to destruction and pain to demons, as it had for Tōga and Sesshōmaru. Tamano leaves to rejoin her grandparents, while Towa finds some relief in enacting her vengeance.
15	15	"Farewell Under the Lunar Eclipse"; Transliteration: "Gesshoku, Unmei no Sekibetsu" (Japanese: 月蝕、運命の惜別)	Akira Toba	Katsuyuki Sumisawa	Kenji Kodama	January 16, 2021	October 10, 2021	
Riku reveals that eighteen years before, he had the demon jeweler Hōsenki the Second to create a second Black Pearl using Izayoi's reassembled rouge, containing her tears of grief for Tōga, and can create a path to his grave. Hōsenki returned the rouge to Kagome and Inuyasha planted the pearl inside his eye for safekeeping. Riku told the pregnant Kagome about the Grim Comet, which was partially destroyed 500 years ago by Kirinmaru and Tōga. As the surviving fragment arrived on Earth through the sky, Inuyasha and Sesshōmaru worked together to destroy it, while Zero warned Sesshōmaru about Kirinmaru. After the teenage Rin gave birth to Towa and Setsuna, Sesshōmaru removed the silver and gold Rainbow Pearls from Joka, planted each of them for his daughters, and left them at the forest. Zero informed Kirinmaru about the existence of Tōga's half-demon twin and quarter-demon granddaughters. Fearing a prophecy left by the Shikon Jewel about him being killed by someone, Sesshōmaru accompanied Kirinmaru, before Inuyasha and Kagome entrusted Moroha and the tincture for Hachiemon. Sesshōmaru extracted the Black Pearl from Inuyasha, and trapped him and Kagome inside it, sending them to Tōga's grave. Hachiemon delivered Moroha to the Wolf-Demon Tribe, in order for them to raise her. Four years later, Homura destroyed the forest, forcing Towa and Setsuna to part ways. Back in the present day, Riku ends the story, affirming he cannot reveal any further.
16	16	"Double-Edged Moroha"; Transliteration: "Moroha no Yaiba" (Japanese: もろはの刃)	Ryūta Kawahara	Katsuyuki Sumisawa	Katsumi Ono	January 23, 2021	November 7, 2021	
Three years earlier, Yawaragi, Moroha's mentor from Kōga's wolf clan, assigned the latter to survive the demon fight inside the Kodoku cave, promising to award her with the Kurikaramaru sword, but forbidding her from using her rouge. As Moroha passes the test, but to pay for the debts with Jyūbei, Yawaragi has Moroha working for him, while she leaves to look for the fire-rat demons to remove her cursed armour, which is slowly compressing her body after she unknowingly wears it. Back at the present day, Yawaragi investigates the village of the fire-rat demons killed by Konton. Konton orders Yawaragi to kill Moroha in exchange for the key to remove the armour. Moroha refuses to use her rouge while fighting Yawaragi. She recalls her past that she nearly lost control of herself when she used her rouge. Yawaragi uses her technique, Scattering Winds, but Moroha deflects it using Kurikaramaru's special technique, Crimson Backlash Wave. As Konton escapes, Moroha inadvertently defeats Yawaragi and buries her there. Realizing she is not alone, Moroha continues her journey.
17	17	"Trap of the Two Perils"; Transliteration: "Ni Kyō no Wana" (Japanese: 二凶の罠)	Sayaka Oda	Katsuhiko Chiba	Kō Matsuo	January 30, 2021	November 14, 2021	
Riku meets Konton, who prepares a spell against the girls and offers himself to lure them to a trap. Riku informs Moroha about Tōtetsu, and learns that Kirinmaru is looking for the Dream Butterfly connecting with Towa and Setsuna. The three follow Tōtetsu to the demonic field of Konton's trap, where they are separated. Towa and Setsuna break free, and pinpoint the location.
18	18	"Sesshomaru and Kirinmaru"; Transliteration: "Sesshōmaru to Kirinmaru" (Japanese: 殺生丸と麒麟丸)	Akira Toba	Katsuhiko Chiba	Kazuo Terada	February 6, 2021	November 21, 2021	
Konton reveals the truth about Zero scattering the Rainbow Pearls across the lands and that they should not exist. Towa and Setsuna defeat Konton, before Riku takes the blue Rainbow Pearl. As the girls follow Tōtetsu to the beach, Kirinmaru drives Tōtetsu off. Towa convinces Kirinmaru to get the butterfly and return Setsuna's dream, but he refuses and fights the girls. Sesshōmaru arrives and fights Kirinmaru to protect his daughters. Kirinmaru spares them, but he reminds Sesshōmaru about them. This leaves Towa, Setsuna, and Moroha quite confused, as Towa wonders what Sesshōmaru did. Moroha fails to summon the Sacred Tree of Ages. Meanwhile, Rin sleeps within the magical tree and Setsuna plays a violin.
19	19	"Princess Aiya's Beniyasha Hunting"; Transliteration: "Aiya Hime no Beniyasha Taiji" (Japanese: 愛矢姫の紅夜叉退治)	Yōji Satō, Kento Matsui	Hiroko Kanasugi	Toshihiko Masuda	February 13, 2021	November 21, 2021	
Moroha participates in a tournament with other bounty hunters to fight the demon slayers ordered by Princess Aiya, the lord's daughter for the Danjo Clan. Setsuna warns Towa she will not hesitate to fight her, if she interferes.
20	20	"The Hidden Village for Half Demons"; Transliteration: "Han'yō no Kakurezato" (Japanese: 半妖の隠れ里)	Kento Nakagomi	Katsuhiko Chiba	Katsumi Ono	February 20, 2021	November 28, 2021	
Setsuna recalls her past after being separated from Towa, and how she was raised by the half bat-demon Shiori, leader of the village of half-demons which she has kept safe with her magical barrier. When the moth-demon Gaga Gozen arrives there, the children aid Miroku while Shiori loses her power during the solar eclipse. Setsuna loses control of her demon blood and kills Gozen, before Miroku subdues Setsuna and applies a strong seal on her demon blood using the naginata she had taken from Gozen. As the solar eclipse ends, Shiori re-erects the shield around the village. Setsuna continues to live in the outside world and promises them that she would bring another half-demon with her. This reminds Setsuna that she and Towa are visiting the same village.
21	21	"Secret of the Rainbow Pearls"; Transliteration: "Nijiiro Shinju no Himitsu" (Japanese: 虹色真珠の秘密)	Katsuya Ōshima	Katsuyuki Sumisawa	Katsuya Ōshima	February 27, 2021	November 28, 2021	
200 years after Tōga's death, Zero wishes upon the Shikon Jewel to seal off her emotions and create the seven Rainbow Pearls. Back in the present day and when Towa loses her power, she accompanies Kaede. In the occasion, Kaede tells Towa that Rin has left the village. Seeing a Dream Butterfly passing nearby, Towa follows it to the Sacred Tree of Ages, and meets Riku. Riku reveals that he intends to gather all seven Rainbow Pearls for Zero, when Tōtetsu appears to attack her. Riku defends Towa, before Setsuna and Moroha arrive. Riku takes the opportunity to stop Tōtetsu and Towa gives him the silver Rainbow Pearl to him to help with his mission, but she regrets it soon after when Setsuna points that Kirinmaru could use them.
22	22	"The Stolen Seal"; Transliteration: "Ubawareta Fūin" (Japanese: 奪われた封印)	Ayumu Ono	Katsuyuki Sumisawa	Ayumu Ono	March 6, 2021	December 12, 2021	
Around 500 years ago, at the palace of Sesshōmaru's mother, she and Zero waited as Tōga and Kirinmaru destroyed the Grim Comet. In the present day, Zero steals the seal from Miroku containing Setsuna's demon blood and dispels it. Setsuna loses control of her demonic powers and goes on a rampage. Sesshōmaru and Tōtōsai react as they feel about Setsuna, with Sesshōmaru stating that she cannot suppress her blood. Towa and Moroha attempt to stop Setsuna, but Miroku's eldest twin daughter Kin'u learns the situation from him, and she and Hisui come to their aid. Towa restrains Setsuna long enough for Kin'u to restore the seal and Setsuna recovers her senses. However, the seal did not contain her blood completely and she decides to find Zero. Meanwhile, in the modern era at Haneda Airport, Towa's homeroom teacher, Osamu Kirin, notices the Grim Comet approaching again, before meeting Sōta and his young daughter Mei, while they waited for Moe.
23	23	"The Three Princesses Strike Back"; Transliteration: "Sanhime no Gyakushū" (Japanese: 三姫の逆襲)	Teruo Satō	Katsuyuki Sumisawa	Kazuo Terada	March 13, 2021	December 12, 2021	
Osamu talks to Sōta and Mei, and learns that Towa has attended Saint Gabriel Academy. As Moe leaves the airplane from her trip to the orchestra contest someplace around the world, Osamu learns that he is the only one who can see the Grim Comet, unbeknownst to everyone. In the feudal era, Kirinmaru discovers the same comet, appearing and falling through the sky. Towa, Setsuna, and Mohoha confront Zero and Riku at Izayoi's ruined palace. In the occasion, Riku reveals that he has collected all seven Rainbow Pearls, before Zero retrieves them to restore her powers. Setsuna takes advantage of her loss and composure, and wounds Zero with her awakening blood blade. When Zero arrives in the afterlife, she reveals that her life is connected to Rin and finds some joy at knowing that they will die, but Sesshōmaru uses a restored Tenseiga to revive her. Zero ragefully berates Sesshōmaru and breaks Tenseiga, before declaring her intent over Towa and Setsuna. She demands Riku to return the Rainbow Pearls for her, containing all of her powerful demonic abilities, until Kirinmaru appears before them.
24	24	"Sesshomaru's Daughter"; Transliteration: "Sesshōmaru no Musume de Aru to Iu Koto" (Japanese: 殺生丸の娘であるということ)	Teruo Satō	Katsuyuki Sumisawa	Teruo Satō, Atsuo Tobe	March 20, 2021	January 2, 2022 (Note: Episode 24 of Yashahime: Princess Half-Demon was originally scheduled to air on Adult Swim on the broadcast night of December 11–12, 2021, but episode 21 was mistakenly reaired in its place.)	
Kirinmaru tries to apologize to Sesshōmaru and Zero, but Sesshōmaru is intent on killing Zero again, no longer worried about Rin bound to hers as it will prolong her sadness. When Kirinmaru takes the Rainbow Pearls from Zero and scatters them, they part ways, leaving Zero and Riku to recollect all pearls. As the girls fight without them, Kirinmaru incapacitates Setsuna by destroying the naginata blade. Believing Setsuna has died peacefully, Towa transforms into her full demon self and Moroha as Beniyasha. They attempt to gain the upper hand, but Kirinmaru overwhelms and spares them. Before leaving, he delays the battle for most days. Towa and Moroha realize they cannot avenge Setsuna. Sesshōmaru returns and gives the broken Tenseiga to Towa.

== Home media release ==
=== Japanese ===
Aniplex+ (Japan – Region 2/A)
Box	Episodes	Release date	Ref.
1	1–12	March 24, 2021	
2	13–24	June 23, 2021	

=== English ===
Viz Media (North America – Region 1/A)
Part		Episodes	Regular edition release date	Limited edition release date	Ref.
Season 1	1	1–12	February 15, 2022		
Season 1	2	13–24	August 9, 2022		
