= Movies Anywhere =

Digital locker and streaming platform

Movies Anywhere, LLC

- Screenshot A screenshot of the 2020 Movies Anywhere welcome screen.
- Former name: Disney Movies Anywhere (2014-2017)
- Website type: Digital rights locker service Video on demand
- Available in: English
- Founded: February 25, 2014; 12 years ago
- Area served: United States; U.S. Territories; Micronesia; Palau
- Owner: The Walt Disney Company
- General manager: Karin Gilford
- Parent: Disney Entertainment
- Website: moviesanywhere.com
- Registration: Required
- Users: 14.5 million (as of May 28, 2026)

Movies Anywhere (MA) is a cloud-based digital rights locker and over-the-top streaming platform that allows users to stream and download purchased films, including digital copies redeemed from codes found in home video releases as well as digital purchases from participating services. Movies Anywhere is operated by The Walt Disney Company. The platform provides content from Walt Disney Studios, Sony Pictures, Universal Pictures, Warner Bros. Pictures, and Lionsgate Studios. The system utilizes an internal platform known as KeyChest, which synchronizes content licenses from digital distribution platforms linked to a central user account.

Movies Anywhere was first launched on February 25, 2014 as Disney Movies Anywhere (DMA), with content from Disney, Pixar, Marvel, and Star Wars-branded films on iOS with iTunes Store integration. On October 12, 2017, DMA changed its name to the Movies Anywhere brand, with other studios joining Disney in offering their film titles through the platform. The service has since been extended to other platforms and storefronts, including Amazon Video, Google TV (formerly Google Play Movies & TV), and Fandango (formerly FandangoNow and Vudu), along with subscribers of DirecTV, Xfinity, and Verizon Fios TV services. It previously included Microsoft Movies & TV until Microsoft ended its digital video service in 2025.

Until July 2019, Movies Anywhere was a competitor to the UltraViolet platform that was deployed by other major film studios; Disney declined to back the platform to promote KeyChest as an alternative. On January 31, 2019, the consortium behind UltraViolet (DECE) announced that it would shut down its services on July 31, 2019. The studios remaining with UltraViolet, including MGM, Paramount Pictures, and Lionsgate, did not move and switch over to Movies Anywhere. Lionsgate would ultimately join the service in June 2026.

== History ==
In 2009, Disney unveiled a rights synchronization platform known as KeyChest, which would allow content purchases via digital distribution platforms to be queried and used to build a centralized library. The company explained that this system would allow "persistent" access to purchased content across multiple digital platforms, including television set-top boxes and mobiles. The platform was viewed as being a competitor to UltraViolet, a competing concept developed by DECE, a consortium containing all other major U.S. film studios but Disney.

Disney Movies Anywhere originally launched on February 25, 2014, as an iOS app that allows users to link Disney films purchased on iTunes Store into a unified library with digital copies of Disney films purchased on physical media, so that they can be streamed or downloaded. The user's Apple ID was linked with a Disney account. The app also allowed users to browse through a catalog of Disney films available on iTunes Store, access supplemental content such as interviews and behind-the-scenes footage, and participate in the Disney Movie Rewards program. Walt Disney Studios CTO Jamie Voris explained that the app was designed to provide a "rich, interactive experience" around its content as an alternative to "utilitarian" online stores and that Disney planned to seek additional retail partners for the service in the future.

In November 2014, support for Google Play Movies & TV and Vudu was added. In September 2015, support for Amazon Video and Microsoft Movies & TV was added, and DMA apps for Android TV and Roku were also released. In August 2016, Verizon Fios became the first television provider to integrate with DMA, allowing purchases through Fios On Demand to be synced into DMA libraries.

In September 2017, DMA ceased support for Microsoft Movies & TV, with future purchases no longer automatically accessible through the linked library.

=== Expansion to third-party foreign outside non-Disney film studios ===
On October 10, 2017, it was reported that the DMA platform would expand to include content from non-Disney studios under the name Movies Anywhere, with 20th Century Fox (which was eventually acquired by Disney in 2019, Sony Pictures, Universal Pictures, and Warner Bros. Pictures serving as initial partners, and Paramount Pictures, Lionsgate, and Metro-Goldwyn Mayer expressing interest. It would also include titles from Disney's Hollywood Pictures and Touchstone Pictures banners that were previously unavailable on DMA. The DMA platform was relaunched on October 12, 2017. The Verge felt that the new platform could be used to replace the commercially unsuccessful UltraViolet platform (which Disney did not support). Despite not being available in the country, the service's new logo drew the attention of Australian users for resembling that of the public broadcaster Australian Broadcasting Corporation (ABC). The logo consists of a combination of the letters M and A, while the ABC's logo is based on the Lissajous curve.

At CES 2018, General Manager Karin Gilford announced that consumers’ accounts had accumulated nearly 80 million films. On February 28, 2018, Disney Movies Anywhere was shut down, with content and accounts migrated to Movies Anywhere. Support for FandangoNow was added on March 13, 2018 (Fandango acquired Vudu and merged the service into it in August 2021), with talks also resuming between Movies Anywhere and Microsoft Movies & TV. By then, there were more than 100 million films in consumer accounts.

On August 6, 2018, it was announced that Microsoft Movies & TV would be rejoining the Movies Anywhere service. By then, the number of films in customer accounts had grown to more than 135 million. In October 2018, Verizon joined the service, followed by Comcast (owner of Universal Pictures) in December.

On January 31, 2019, Ultraviolet announced that it would terminate its services on July 31, 2019, owing to increased support for Movies Anywhere. While Lionsgate and Paramount dropped out of that service in July and December 2018, they have not made any transition to Movies Anywhere. MGM, the remaining studio that continued to utilize Ultraviolet, also did not transition to Movies Anywhere (although some co-productions with other studios are available on Movies Anywhere).

In March 2020, amid the COVID-19 pandemic, Movies Anywhere began to add features allowing digital sharing of purchases. That month, "Screen Pass" entered closed beta, which allowed users to share up to three films per month and gave recipients 14 days to watch each shared film. Once a film is played from Screen Pass, recipients are then given a 72-hour window to finish the film. Screen Pass was officially released in September 2020. In July 2020, the service also added "Watch Together". Both features were discontinued on May 1, 2023. In August 2020, DirecTV became the first satellite TV provider to join the Movies Anywhere platform.

On October 31, 2025, Google abruptly withdrew support for Movies Anywhere. The decision is believed to be tied to a carriage dispute between YouTube TV and Disney. This dispute was settled by November 14, but it took over a month for Movies Anywhere to regain support from Google.

On May 28, 2026, Lionsgate announced they would be joining the service in June 2026, with 225 of their most high-profile films being added during the initial phase, and approximately 100 films being added per month throughout the rest of 2026 and early 2027.
