= Intertrust Technologies Corporation =

Software company

- Type: Private
- Industry: Computer software
- Founded: 1990
- Founder: Victor Shear
- Headquarters: Berkeley, California
- Key people: Talal Shamoon (CEO); David Maher (CTO); Robert Tarjan (Chief Scientist)
- Products: IntertrustConnect, ExpressPlay, MarketMaker, and iPKI
- Website: www.intertrust.com

Intertrust Technologies Corporation is a software technology company specializing in trusted distributed computing. Intertrust’s product lines consist of a DataOps platform, Application protection and Content protection solutions. Much of Intertrust's digital rights management (DRM) business is based on the Marlin DRM technology, which Intertrust founded along with four consumer electronics companies: Sony, Panasonic, Philips, and Samsung.

Intertrust is headquartered in Silicon Valley and has offices in Tokyo, Seoul, London, Paris, Mumbai, Beijing, Tallinn, Riga and Bangalore.

== History ==
Victor H. Shear received a BA in sociology from Brandeis University, was chief executive of Data Scientific Corporation from 1982 to 1985, and then co-founded Personal Library Software. Around 1985, Shear attempted to obtain one of the first US patents for software. For example, one patent covered metering and protecting data on a compact disc from 1986.

The company began under the name Electronic Publishing Resources in January 1990. David M. Van Wie became involved with Intertrust in early 1991. Intertrust's technology, called digital rights management (DRM), enabled trusted transactions, from healthcare, enterprise computing to entertainment and consumer electronics. In 1995, the company announced its technology would be used by Novell. Former Bell Labs Fellow David P. Maher became chief technology officer in 1999. In 1996, Electronic Publishing Resources was renamed Intertrust Technologies.

At the peak of the Internet bubble in October 1999, despite a lack of any earnings, Intertrust had its initial public offering. It was listed on the NASDAQ exchange with symbol ITRU. Within six months, the share price rose from $9 to $35, and a secondary offering on April 12, 2000 raised another $92 million.

In 2001, two companies were acquired: PublishOne, Inc., and ZeroGravity Technologies, and Nokia invested $20 million. However, by the end of 2001 losses had climbed to over $115 million a year, and shares were sometimes trading below $1 each. Workforce reductions and office closures were announced in October 2001 and January 2002, which helped to end the losses. In May 2002, further workforce reductions were announced, and marketing and development of software ceased as the company focused on licensing intellectual property. In early 2003, the company became a joint venture of Philips, Sony and Stephens Inc., and Talal Shamoon was appointed as the CEO

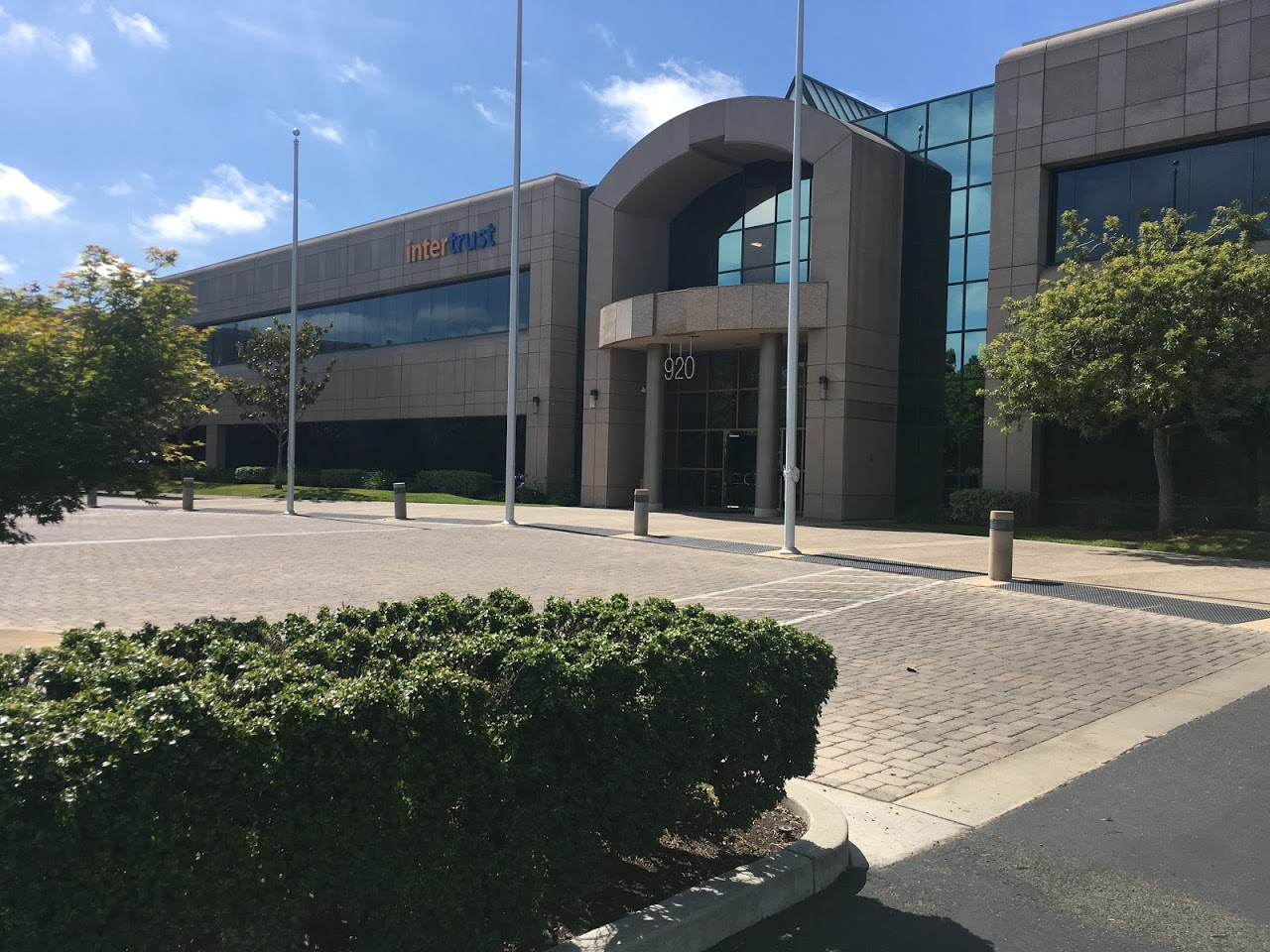
Intertrust Office 920 Stewart Dr #100 Sunnyvale, CA 94085

In April 2004, Microsoft settled the 2001 lawsuit, and agreed to pay $440 million to license Intertrust’s patents. The week before the settlement, Microsoft and Time Warner announced they had acquired a majority stake in ContentGuard, a company which developed similar software.

In 2006, the company co-founded the Coral Consortium for content interoperability with Fox, Samsung, Sony, Philips, Panasonic and HP.

Intertrust licensed DRM technologies to large technology and media corporations. The company then developed technology called Marlin, with mixed success. The continued emphasis on intellectual property caused the company to be called a "patent troll", although the New York Times argued that Intertrust "does not quite fit that profile". Huawei Technologies announced it would license Marlin in 2011. A 2007 venture using Marlin with Pioneer Corporation called SyncTV had an investment from HTC Corporation in 2012.

A public key infrastructure (PKI) service for Marlin called Seacert was announced in 2011.

Between 2008 and 2016, Intertrust invested in companies that developed synergistic technologies.

In 2010, the company entered into a Latvian-based joint venture called whiteCryption that markets application security technologies.

In March, 2013, Intertrust filed a patent suit against Apple Inc. Apple settled the suit in April 2014 for undisclosed terms.

In October 2014, Princeton University professor Robert Tarjan rejoined Intertrust as chief scientist.

In December 2016, the company added two investors, the German utility company Innogy (acquired by E.ON in 2020) and the Japan - U.S. venture capital company World Innovation Lab.

In April 2017 the company launched with Google the PatentShield program.

In May 2019, the Australian energy company Origin Energy invested $20 million USD in Intertrust.

In June 2020, the company announced the Intertrust Platform, which has been described as “a complete ecosystem of data security and rights management products”.
