= Digital copy =

Audiovisual media in computer files

A digital copy is a commercially distributed computer file containing a media product such as a film or music album. The term contrasts this computer file with the physical copy (typically a DVD, Blu-ray, Blu-ray 3D, or Ultra HD Blu-ray disc) with which the digital copy is usually offered as part of a bundle. It allows the disc's purchaser to acquire a single copy of the film on a digital device such as a personal computer, smartphone, tablet computer, or digital media player, and view it on those devices without requiring access to the physical media, launched on October 2007. "Digital copy" is also commonly referred to as "digital HD" (where it is referencing a high-definition or UHD digital copy).

== Features ==
There are three types of a digital copy. The first is a copy made in advance and included on the disc. The second is created dynamically from the DVD content itself. In both scenarios the publisher decides which content, formats, digital rights management (DRM) systems and technical parameters are used for the Digital Copy. Digital Copy systems based on existing pre-generated files are less flexible than dynamic transcoding solutions. The third version is an alphanumeric code included on a slip of paper within the physical film's keep case, which is typed in and redeemed at an online portal which allows the customer to download the film at the store of their choice, using their own bandwidth, or stream it through a cloud service at the time of viewing as part of a retailer's digital locker where the customer retains permanent access to the film's digital file.

In the past with the first two types, the digital copy files based on existing files included only the main audio track (often only stereo) and no subtitles, compared to the multiple audio tracks and multiple subtitle options available from DVD and Blu-ray. Also, the quality was limited by the bitrate used to encode the file which is typically relatively low and not adjusted to the device to be transferred to. Bonus features were also unavailable for the most part until online movie stores were able to include them as bonus files with the download.

Digital copy files based on transcoding solutions can use the correct audio track and subtitle based on the user's location or choice and individually create the digital copy based on the target device properties (video and audio bitrate, display resolution, aspect ratio and device utilize for viewing the copy).

Most often, digital copy solutions mainly offered Apple iTunes files with their respective DRM services, with Windows Media with Windows Media DRM and FairPlay also used, but due to the latter's lack of success in the market, most digital copies utilized iTunes. Other solutions also provided support for Sony PlayStation Portable and pre-smartphone age feature phones using 3GP video files and Open Mobile Alliance DRM. Some publishers limited their digital copies to Microsoft operating systems and devices.

With audio compact discs, the original intent of having a digital copy of the album on the same disc was to discourage piracy by only allowing the ripping of a version of the album in a proprietary file format with digital rights management. Due to a number of factors, including the controversial inclusion of rootkits on albums associated with Sony Music labels, along with the proprietary files and interface generally being able to be easy to bypass with a simple keystroke to access the CD versions of the track and rip them to MP3, the inclusion of separate digital copies has been completely deprecated in the music industry, though a download code for a digital version compatible with phones, portable media players, or rights to a higher-bitrate copy on a digital music service might be included for an analog format purchase of an album, such as an LP record or cassette tape.

To limit the number of free copies, the disc typically comes with a single-use alphanumeric code to authenticate the ownership of the title over the Internet; some versions of the concept come with a QR code containing the single-use code in order to allow it to be scanned by a smartphone camera, saving the user time from having to type in the long code, which may contain homoglyphs that may be typed in wrong. Often the authentication code may have an expiration date, rendering the copy invalid if it the redemption code is fulfilled after that time. In common practice, most codes have remained available to redeem well after the printed expiration date, in order to keep customer goodwill and avoid complaints about the inability to redeem a code for a title which continues to sell older stock. Over time, this became the preferred method of digital copy validation over including a disc digital file in the package.

== Reception ==
Technology industry analyst Michael Gartenberg described the digital copy initiative as "a smart move" providing an easier alternative to customers compared to converting the files themselves using software such as HandBrake. Gartenberg was critical of Sony for restricting themselves to files for the PlayStation Portable that were not widely compatible with more popular personal media devices, such as iOS devices.

Fred von Lohmann of the Electronic Frontier Foundation described digital copy schemes as "stealing your fair use rights and selling them back to you piecemeal", disputing claims by Hollywood studios that it is illegal for customers to rip a personal copy of a DVD to put on a portable video player, even if they own the DVD. Jon Healey of the Los Angeles Times pointed out that, with DVDs, consumers were being asked to pay more for uses they had before at no extra cost with CDs and cassette tapes.

Steven J. Vaughan-Nichols of ComputerWorld.com describes digital copy as "nonsense, a feature that is no feature at all." He criticizes it as an attempt by the industry to sugar-coat DRM, complaining that viewers should be able to watch the movie they have bought on any device they want, and that media companies should change their business plans to meet their customers' legitimate needs.

== See also ==
- Managed Copy
- Movies Anywhere
- UltraViolet (website)
