= Coral Consortium =

DRM architecture consortium (2004–2012)

The Coral Consortium was founded in 2004 by Hewlett-Packard Corporation, InterTrust Technologies, Koninklijke Philips Electronics N.V., Matsushita Electric Industrial Co., Ltd. (Panasonic), Samsung Electronics Co., Ltd, Sony Corporation and Twentieth Century Fox Film Corp. The Coral Consortium was dissolved in December 2012. Its last specification was available until April 1, 2013.

Coral proposed an architecture whereby devices using different DRM technologies are able to join a Domain that allows them to exchange protected content securely. A device used by a family member wishing to play a music file that is stored on another family-owned device could use Coral to obtain a new copy (or license) in the correct format, with the Coral infrastructure managing the necessary permissions and translation of rights to the new device. In theory this should greatly ease the portability of protected media files between devices.

== Membership ==
Coral distinguishes between Promoter and Contributor members.

=== Promoter members ===
- Hewlett-Packard Corporation (founding member)
- IFPI
- Intertrust Technologies Corporation (founding member)
- Koninklijke Philips Electronics N.V. (founding member)
- LG Electronics
- NBC Universal, Inc.
- Panasonic Corporation (founding member)
- Samsung Electronics Co., Ltd (founding member)
- Sony Corporation (founding member)
- Twentieth Century Fox Film Corp. (founding member)

=== Contributor members ===
- British Telecommunications PLC
- Cloakware Inc.
- EMI Music
- Gibson Guitar Corporation
- Inca Networks
- Kenwood Corporation
- Motion Picture Association of America
- Motorola
- PacketVideo
- Recording Industry Association of America (RIAA)
- SecureMedia Inc.
- Sony BMG
- Starz Entertainment, LLC
- STMicroelectronics, N.V.
- Thomson
- Universal Music Group
- Verimatrix, Inc.
- VeriSign, Inc.
- Warner Music Group

== Additional information ==
Much of the Coral documentation requires the reader to agree to legal conditions, so it is not very easy for most members of the public to examine the proposals. However, there is a fairly full FAQ document available (Coral Consortium FAQ Document).

== Possible limitations ==
While Coral is a novel approach to DRM interoperability, doubts have been raised in some quarters as to whether it is really suitable for all media types.

- The approach of obtaining a second file protected under the second DRM system assumes that such a file is available, and also assumes that both DRM vendors (and service providers) will cooperate with Coral. At the time of writing, Apple is not a Coral member company.
- The Coral membership leans heavily to music companies; other content types (e.g. video, TV, games) are not so strongly represented.
- The bandwidth requirements (and download delay) for obtaining a second copy of a large file such as an HD TV broadcast are considerable.
- Some Europeans have expressed concerns over consumer privacy and anonymity, if all such content moves involve a "phone home" to a Coral service in the cloud.
