= Digital locker (disambiguation) =

A digital locker is an online file storage service.

Digital locker may also refer to:

- Windows Marketplace, Digital Locker was a component of a Microsoft digital store
- Digital Locker, a digital locker service in India
