= UltraViolet (website) =

Digital rights locker for films and TV programs

UltraViolet logo

UltraViolet was a cloud-based digital rights locker for films and television programs that allowed consumers to store proofs-of-purchase of licensed content in an account to enable playback on different devices using multiple applications from several different streaming services. UltraViolet also allowed users to share access to their library with up to five additional people. UltraViolet was deployed by the Digital Entertainment Content Ecosystem (DECE), an alliance of 85 companies that included film studios, retailers, consumer electronics manufacturers, cable television companies, internet service providers (ISPs), internet hosting vendors, and other systems and security vendors, with the notable exceptions of Walt Disney Studios, Google, Amazon, MGM, and Apple.

On January 31, 2019, DECE announced that UltraViolet would shut down on July 31, 2019. This shutdown came after the launch of Movies Anywhere over a year earlier, along with Fox, Universal, Lionsgate, Paramount, and Warner Bros. beginning to drop out of issuing new UV rights for their films during that time period.

== Operation ==
To use UltraViolet, consumers needed to create a free account, either through a participating UltraViolet service provider, or through the official website. An UltraViolet account was a digital rights locker where licenses (effectively receipts) for purchased content were stored and managed irrespective of the point of sale. The account holder was allowed to share their library with 5 other users, which were called members.

Consumers could acquire UltraViolet rights by purchasing a physical disc that included an UltraViolet activation code, by purchasing a movie directly from an electronic retailer (a.k.a. EST, or Electronic sell-through), or by using a disc to digital service (D2D). Disc to digital services allowed consumers to insert a DVD or Blu-ray into their computer's disc drive, scan it to verify ownership, and then add it to their UltraViolet collection for a fee. Several retailers including Vudu and CinemaNow offered this service. Flixster had been offering a D2D service as well, but it was suspended once Fandango acquired Flixster in early 2016 and another independent movie streaming service, M-GO.

Consumers could then stream or download their UltraViolet content from any participating retailer. Former participating retailers are listed in the table below.

The UltraViolet digital locker did not store video files, and was not a "cloud storage" platform. Only the rights for purchased content were stored on the service. UltraViolet only coordinated and managed the licenses for each account, but not the content itself. By creating a digital-rights locker rather than a digital media storage locker, UltraViolet bypassed the cost of storage and bandwidth used when the media is accessed and passed that cost on to various service providers.

== Content partners ==
Five of the then "Big Six" major film studios (now the "Big Four" since 2026) and "mini-major" Lionsgate were members of DECE, and released their content with UltraViolet rights. Other minor film and television studios released their programming and movies with UltraViolet rights, but were not DECE members.

- Major film studios
  - Sony Pictures Entertainment (films released for digital distribution before August 2019)
  - Universal Studios (films released for digital distribution before January 2018)
  - Paramount Pictures (films released for digital distribution before December 2018)
  - Warner Bros. Entertainment (films released for digital distribution before March 2019)
  - Fox Entertainment Group (films released for digital distribution before December 2017; studio's acquisition by Disney reduced the number of majors to five)
- Minor Film Studios
  - Lionsgate (films released for digital distribution before July 17, 2018)
  - The Weinstein Company (films released for digital distribution before the company shut down in May 2018)
  - Roadshow Entertainment
  - Anchor Bay (films released for digital distribution before the company shut down in 2017)
  - DreamWorks Animation (films released for digital distribution before October 2017; studio previously purchased and acquired by Universal)
- Television Studios
  - BBC
  - HBO

Despite Fox merging with Disney in 2019, Walt Disney Studios was never a member of DECE, and did not release any of their films with UltraViolet rights. On February 25, 2014, Disney launched a competing digital movie locker system called Disney Movies Anywhere that allowed any Disney movie purchased or redeemed at any participating provider to be played using all other DMA providers. DMA providers included iTunes, Vudu, Google Play, Amazon Video, and Microsoft Movies & TV. On October 12, 2017, Disney Movies Anywhere was expanded to include movies from a number of non-Disney studios, thus forming a full-fledged UltraViolet competitor. This service is now called Movies Anywhere to reflect the expanded scope of content.

== UltraViolet digital retailers ==
UltraViolet content was available from several movie streaming services. Some services offered downloads that could be saved to PCs, tablets, gaming consoles, or phones for offline viewing. Below is a table of all the streaming providers and the countries they serve.

Content could also be streamed over the Internet to an unlimited number of devices, depending on the content license rights held by the streaming provider.

=== Comparison of streaming providers ===
	Resolution				Disc to Digital	Movies Anywhere	Availability by Country
	SD (480p)	HD (720p)	HDX (1080p)	UHD (4k)	Disc to Digital	Movies Anywhere	Availability by Country
VUDU	Yes	Yes	Yes	Yes	Yes	Yes	US
FandangoNow (previously M-GO)	Yes	Yes	Yes	Yes	No	Yes	US
Flixster Video	Yes	Yes	Yes	No	No	No	UK, CA, FR, DE, NZ, IE, CH, AT, AU, BE, NL, LU

Other less notable streaming providers include: Kaleidescape, Verizon Fios On Demand, Videociety, and Nolim Films.

=== Player support of streaming providers ===
	Set-top box					Video game console				Smartphone / Tablet		
	Roku	Apple	Google		Amazon	Microsoft		Sony		Apple	Google	Microsoft
	Roku	Apple TV	Chromecast	Android TV	Fire TV	Xbox 360	Xbox One	PS3	PS4	iOS	Android	Windows Phone
VUDU	Yes	Yes	Yes	Yes	Yes	Yes	Yes	Yes	Yes	Yes	Yes	Yes
FandangoNow (previously M-Go)	Yes	AirPlay	Yes	Yes	No	No	Yes	No	No	Yes	Yes	No
Flixster Video	No	AirPlay	Yes	No	No	No	No	No	No	Yes	Yes	No

== Download capability ==
Some Ultraviolet streaming providers offered the capability to download movies and TV shows. They had their own proprietary video formats, and they were not cross-platform. They had to be downloaded and played within their own proprietary PC, Mac, iOS, or Android apps.

The Ultraviolet Common File Format (CFF) was planned, but never launched. The CFF was an attempt by the DECE to allow downloaded video files to be copied between devices, stored on physical media (e.g. DVDs, SD cards, flash memory) or online backup services. They were intended to be playable on any UltraViolet authorized device (e.g. Blu-ray, streaming media player, Smart TV', or mobile device) or software player registered to the household Ultraviolet library.

A 2015 simplification of the UV ecosystem made the Common File Format optional for studios and streaming providers. CFF was never supported by any retailers nor was it ever released to a consumer audience.

== Selected DRM technologies ==
UltraViolet Streaming providers were free to choose whatever DRM technologies they wanted to use for streaming and downloads.

DECE approved six DRM technologies for use in conjunction with the proposed common file format, which was never launched.

The selected DRM technologies were:

- Google Widevine DRM, chosen for its strong position on set-top boxes
- Marlin DRM, chosen for its compatibility with many Connected TVs
- OMA CMLA-OMA v2, chosen for its strong position on mobile devices
- Microsoft PlayReady, chosen for its wide availability on PC and CE devices
- Adobe Primetime DRM, chosen for its wide availability on PC devices
- DivX DRM

== History ==
=== 2010 ===
In September, Mitch Singer, the President of DECE, announced the upcoming launch of the "UltraViolet" system in an interview with Home Media Magazine.

=== 2011 ===
In January, a number of major film studios announced support for UltraViolet. They were: Warner Bros, Sony Pictures, Fox, Universal, Paramount, and Lionsgate. The notable exception was Walt Disney.

On October 11, the UltraViolet system launched with the Warner Bros release of Horrible Bosses, the first UV title. Flixster re-launched as the first UltraViolet streaming service. Sony subsequently released its first two UV titles in December, The Smurfs and Friends with Benefits. Universal soon followed with the release of its first UV title, Cowboys & Aliens.

In December, UltraViolet launched in the UK with the Warner Bros release of Final Destination 5.

=== 2012 ===
At the Consumer Electronics Show in January, Amazon became the first major retailer to announce support for UltraViolet. The DEG reported that 750k accounts had been created in the first 3 months.

In January, Paramount released its first UV title "Paranormal Activity 3" and in April DreamWorks Animation became the seventh studio to join the UltraViolet initiative with "Shrek", "Madagascar", "Kung Fu Panda" and "How to Train Your Dragon". Also in April, Vudu (operated by Walmart) became the first major UltraViolet retailer by adding UV rights to thousands of films. Walmart also launched an in-store "Disc to Digital" service, with more than 4,000 titles initially.

Between August and September, Lionsgate and 20th Century Fox released their first titles on UV. UltraViolet surpassed 5 million users and 7,200 titles on September 20.

Redbox announced a partnership with UltraViolet for its new Redbox Instant streaming service on October 25. Ultraviolet support never materialized, and the service shut down on October 7, 2014.

On October 30, Barnes & Noble announced it would launch an UltraViolet enabled electronic video store for its new Nook HD tablet.

Best Buy's CinemaNow became the second major UV retailer on November 24. CinemaNow launched an in-home Disc to Digital service (in beta) in December.

=== 2013 ===
In January, DreamWorks Animation and Technicolor launched M-GO, a new streaming platform with UV capability, and Cineplex became the first UltraViolet retailer in Canada.

In April, Best Buy announced a deal to make its UV ready Cinema Now service available in Canada. In May, UltraViolet launched in Australia and New Zealand, Kaleidescape opened a UV ready video download store, and 20th Century Fox announced it would offer Digital HD UltraViolet rights with all new films.

In September, CinemaNow launched its Disc to Digital service in Canada. and Target Ticket launched with UltraViolet capability. Ultraviolet expanded to France, Germany, Austria, and Switzerland in November.

=== 2014 ===
In January, DECE launched a revamped UltraViolet website with new features. On February 25, Disney launched Disney Movies Anywhere, a streaming service. The next day, Mitch Singer, the President of DECE, stated that the new Disney Movies Anywhere service would not prohibit Disney from offering UltraViolet titles in the future.

At the end of March, Vudu became the first UV retailer to offer Google Chromecast support for UltraViolet content. Flixster also became a retailer for UV in March.

In May, Vudu introduced a new feature that allowed UltraViolet users to share their movies with up to five friends. Also in May, Flixster became the first UV retailer to support Apple Airplay.

In October MGM began to offer UV rights for several of its catalog titles. Also in October, Tesco's BlinkBox became the first official UV retailer in the U.K.

On Nov. 12, KnowHow, a UK streaming movie provider, relaunched as CinemaNow and added Ultraviolet support. Also in November Verizon FIOS on Demand introduced UltraViolet capability.

=== 2015 ===
On January 6, The DEG announced that UltraViolet grew 30% in 2014 to 21 million accounts.

French supermarket chain Carrefour opened a digital video store with UltraViolet functionality called Nolim Films on January 27.

Target Corporation shut down its Target Ticket service on March 7, and allowed users to transfer their purchases to CinemaNow and Disney Movies Anywhere.

UltraViolet surpassed 22 million users on May 25.

Australian UV Partner EZYFlix.tv closed down on August 18.

=== 2016 ===
On Jan 6, The DEG reported that UltraViolet accounts grew by almost 20 percent in 2015 to hit more than 25 million with 165 million movies and television shows in UltraViolet libraries.

On January 29, Fandango acquired the M-GO movie service, and planned to re-launch it later that year under a new name.

On March 3, Barnes and Noble announced that it would shutter its Nook Video Store on March 15.

On March 30, M-GO became Fandango Now and launched Airplay support.

On April 4, BlinkBox —owned by TalkTalk— stopped supporting the PlayStation 3.

On June 29, an update was released for the Nvidia Shield Android TV console that enabled support for the Vudu app. Vudu became the first UltraViolet service available on the popular device.

On Sept 1, the Cineplex Store stopped offering Ultraviolet services.

=== 2017 ===
On March 20, JB Hi-Fi NOW Video service announced that it would close on 13 April 2017.

On March 23, Vudu expanded its Disc to Digital service. Users could now convert their movie library using the Vudu app on a mobile phone. They also announced that the in-store Disc to Digital program would be suspended on April 1.

As of March 27, UltraViolet accounts grew to 28 million.

In April, it was noticed that movies from Relativity Media that were distributed by 20th Century Fox, were no longer UV enabled. If you had purchased/redeemed the movie prior to the removal of UV rights, the movie remained in your UV locker.

In late May, Universal Studios began referring to UltraViolet as only "Digital HD" on the back of its Blu-ray releases. 20th Century Fox started this practice in 2016. Both studios films were still UltraViolet enabled at select retailers.

On July 1, it was reported that UltraViolet surpassed 30 million users.

In mid-July, CinemaNow removed UV support for all movies. Questions to UltraViolet were answered with the response, "CinemaNow is not participating in UV at this time."

On August 1, the CinemaNow website began redirecting to Filmon.tv, a Live TV streaming service in the UK.

On August 21, U.S. Flixster Video announced "As of August 28, 2017, Flixster Video will no longer support code redemptions or streaming and downloading of content. Redeem codes and access your Flixster video collection after that date by signing up or logging into Vudu or FandangoNOW."

On August 22, Vudu launched their AppleTV app, which became the first app to support UltraViolet movies and TV shows on the Apple TV platform.

On October 12, 2017, it was announced that Disney Movies Anywhere would expand to include non-Disney studios under the name Movies Anywhere, with 20th Century Fox, Sony Pictures, Universal, and Warner Bros. joining Disney as initial partners, and Lionsgate and Paramount Pictures expressing interest.

On November 28, digital releases of Detroit and Patti Cake$ were the last films released by 20th Century Fox Home Entertainment to receive UV rights, while Kingsman: The Golden Circle was the first to be released without UV rights.

=== 2018 ===
January 2, the first U.S. digital releases of 2018 from Universal Pictures were released without UV rights. Joining 20th Century Fox as the second studio to drop UV rights for new releases.

From 15 January 2018 the Ultraviolet service was no longer available on TalkTalk TV.

March 13 - FandangoNow joined MoviesAnywhere, and stopped offering UV rights for MA affiliated studios' films.

July 11, Twentieth Century Fox stopped issuing UV rights for all new purchases for catalog titles that were previously UV enabled.

July 17, Lionsgate titles released on or after July 17, 2018, would no longer be available on UltraViolet.

Sept 18, Universal Studios stopped issuing UV rights for all new purchases for catalog titles that were previously UV enabled.

December 11, 2018, Paramount stopped issuing UV rights for all new releases moving forward. One week after, the final UV title was released with Mission: Impossible – Fallout.

=== 2019 ===
On January 30, Variety reported that DECE would shut down UltraViolet on July 31, 2019, with DECE officially confirming the news the next day. Users that had at least one major retailer, like Vudu, connected to their UV account would be able to maintain streaming rights to movies and TV shows redeemed via the platform through those retailers.

On January 31, Sony Pictures Store shut down its website and discontinued all related operations in the U.S. except for their ULTRA 4K app.

On March 4, Verizon ended the linking of any additional Fios accounts with UltraViolet. Existing Fios accounts already linked to UltraViolet were not affected.

On March 13, Warner Bros. stopped issuing UV rights for all new purchases of catalog titles that had previously been UV enabled.

On March 18, Paramount Pictures issued a notice that the ability to rent, buy, or playback films via ParamountMovies.com would cease effective immediately. Additionally, redemption of digital copies began redirecting users to either Vudu or FandangoNow.

On March 27, Verizon ended UltraViolet services on Fios. Titles that had previously imported into Fios library via UltraViolet remained unaffected.

On April 18, Sony Pictures informed customers via email and directly via the ULTRA 4K app that effective immediately new account sign-up, purchase, and redeem functions were to be removed from its TV and Windows apps. Customers could still use the ULTRA 4K app to stream films and TV shows in their UV library.

On May 31, 2019, Kaleidescape disconnected from UltraViolet. Any titles purchased at other retailers that had previously imported from UltraViolet remained in the Kaleidescape library.

On July 26, 2019, Flixster Video informed its non-US subscribers by email of the impending UV shutdown on July 31, 2019. Flixster Video assured its subscribers that the shutdown of UltraViolet would not impact the titles already in the subscribers' Flixster collection. Flixster Video also went on to announce of its own shutdown late in 2019 (a date was not mentioned) and that arrangements had been made with Google Play to enable migration of available videos on subscribers' Flixster account to Google Play. They mentioned that they had expected the migration process to be available in July, but was not ready yet.

On July 31, the Ultraviolet website was available for the last time for subscribers. The website was closed on the next day on August 1, 2019.

On September 24, 2019, Flixster Video informed its non-US subscribers by email that it was planning to shut down its website, applications and operations on December 18, 2019. In the email, Flixster Video also announced that the arrangement for transfer of subscribers' videos to Google Play was ready. A link to start the migration process to Google Play was embedded in the email. Flixster's website provided information and instructions about migrating to Google Play. Flixster urged subscribers to complete the migration process to Google Play as soon as possible. They also mentioned that playback of subscribers videos would still be available through Flixster video until shutdown.

After the demise of Ultraviolet, current Paramount releases with a digital code have featured a portal on Paramount's home entertainment website where a choice of retailer redemption can be made (usually either iTunes, Google Play Movies/YouTube or Vudu), while Lionsgate currently requires the download of an app and requires the reception of their newsletter list via email to confirm the ownership of a title before the choice of retailer redemption is made; MGM films often depend on the actual home video distributor contracted by MGM to release each individual film (although some MGM films like Missing Link and Booksmart also end up in Movies Anywhere, usually through 20th Century Fox Home Entertainment).

On October 1, FandangoNOW completed transferring over UV titles to users' regular Movies and TV libraries and removed the Ultraviolet links from their website and apps.

== See also ==
- Movies Anywhere, Disney's competing digital rights locker
