= CinemaNow =

Streaming media company

CinemaNow, LLC
- Industry: Video on demand
- Founded: 1999; 27 years ago
- Founder: Curt Marvis and Bruce Eisen
- Defunct: August 1, 2017; 9 years ago
- Headquarters: Los Angeles, California, U.S.
- Area served: US, Canada and United Kingdom
- Services: Video content delivery
- Number of employees: 120
- Parent: Sonic Solutions (2008–2010); Best Buy (2010–2014); Regent Equity Partners (2014–2016); FilmOn (2016–2017)

CinemaNow, LLC was an international over-the-top (OTT) provider of video on demand and streaming media. It was available to viewers in the United States, Canada and the United Kingdom. The company was founded in 1999 and was headquartered in Los Angeles, California. CinemaNow was sold several times and was eventually shut down on August 1, 2017.

The CinemaNow platform was available on the web, on mobile devices running Android and iOS, on PlayStation and Xbox game consoles, and on CE devices including LG, Panasonic, Samsung, and Toshiba. Videos from CinemaNow were available for electronic sell-through via Download To Own, in the home video release window, DVD burning, as well as rental time-limited viewing in the pay-per-view window. As of 2016, the company had 55,000 movies and TV episodes in its library.

== History ==
CinemaNow was founded in 1999 as one of the first video on demand Internet streaming media platforms.

In July 2004, it raised an $11 million Series D round from Menlo Ventures, Cisco Systems and Lions Gate Entertainment.

In July 2006, it raised a $20.3 million Series E round from EchoStar, Cisco Systems, Index Holdings, Menlo Ventures, Lions Gate Entertainment, and Microsoft.

In November 2008, Sonic Solutions acquired CinemaNow.

In January 2009, Sonic and Blockbuster announced a strategic alliance to provide digital content delivery under the Blockbuster brand, essentially merging the digital storefronts of CinemaNow and Blockbuster.

In 2010, Sonic Solutions and Best Buy announced a strategic alliance which resulted in Best Buy's acquiring the CinemaNow brand.

Sonic Solutions rebranded the CinemaNow movie technology as RoxioNow, which became a white label movie store business. Sonic Solutions was acquired by Rovi Corporation for $775 million in December 2010 and continued to operate the white label movie store business, which was renamed the Rovi Entertainment Store.

In July 2013, Rovi announced that the Rovi Entertainment Store had been acquired by Reliance Majestic Holdings LLC, a new media company backed by Proveho Capital, a private equity firm based in Austin, Texas. In July 2014, Best Buy sold the CinemaNow business to the private equity firm Regent Equity Partners.

The company changed hands again in January 2016, when Regent Equity Partners sold CinemaNow to the UK-based company FilmOn. Reports surfaced in August 2017 that the site had become inaccessible, and it was later confirmed that CinemaNow had been removed from Ultraviolet's list of providers.

== See also ==
- Comparison of digital distribution platforms for mobile devices
