= Yashahime season 2 =

Yashahime: Princess Half-Demon – The Second Act
- Season 2
- Cover art of the third home media box set released by Aniplex in Japan.
- No. of episodes: 24

Release
- Original network: NNS (ytv)
- Original release: October 2, 2021 – March 26, 2022

Season chronology
- ← Previous; Season 1

Yashahime: Princess Half-Demon is a Japanese anime television series produced by Sunrise that serves as a sequel to Rumiko Takahashi's Inuyasha series. In March 2021, a second season of the series was announced following the end of the first season. The second and final season, subtitled Yashahime: Princess Half-Demon – The Second Act, aired from October 2, 2021, to March 26, 2022. From episodes 25–37, the first opening theme is "ReBorn" performed by NEWS and the first ending theme is "Toumei na Sekai" performed by Little Glee Monster. From episode 38–48, the second opening theme is "Kyōmei" (Resonance) performed by SixTones, and the second ending theme is "Anaaki no Sora" (Perforated Sky) by Adieu (Moka Kamishiraishi).

On November 4, 2021, Viz Media announced an English dub for the season, which premiered the next day on Crunchyroll, Funimation, and Hulu. The English dub of the season aired on Adult Swim's Toonami programming block on July 31, 2022.

== Episode list ==
No. overall	No. in season	Title (Note: All English episode titles taken from Crunchyroll.)	Directed by	Written by	Storyboarded by	Original release date	English air date	Ref.
25	1	"Wielding the Tenseiga"; Transliteration: "Tenseiga o Motsu to Iu Koto" (Japanese: 天生牙を持つということ)	Akira Toba	Katsuyuki Sumisawa	Masakazu Hishida	October 2, 2021	July 31, 2022	
Towa uses a limited amount of energy for Tenseiga to destroy the afterlife imps and resurrect Setsuna, before falling unconscious. Tōtōsai arrives at the scene, reforges the naginata and names the new blade "Yukari no Tachikiri". Setsuna wakes up and uses it to destroy all demons. Tōtōsai borrows Tenseiga from Sesshōmaru for a three-day mending. Before leaving, Tōtōsai warns Setsuna to survive. While Towa recovers, Tōtōsai instructs Setsuna to find a mystical Kyūyōkon Root from a 2000-year-old Magnolia tree Bokusenō, and for Towa to replace the sword.
26	2	"Demon Spirit of the Sea"; Transliteration: "Umi no Yōrei" (Japanese: 海の妖霊)	Kento Nakagomi	Hiroko Kanasugi	Kazuo Terada	October 9, 2021	August 7, 2022	
While Setsuna retrieves the root, Moroha asks Jyūbei about Bokusenō, by finding a demon with wisdom and mystical abilities. Moroha and Setsuna find it, but are ambushed by the snake-demon spirit disguised as a human nun, who desires Setsuna to appease her about not restoring her true form. Towa arrives in time to aid a group of demon-slayers, wearing sunglasses to protect everyone from being petrified. It is that Setsuna realizes she can put an end to all of this suffering. She utilizes her weapon's ability to cut any discovered immaterial beings, in order to restore the destiny of the snake-demon and that of her human love, a fisherman. The Snake-Demon peacefully regains her true form and returns to the sea. As the girls leave the beach, Riku learns that Towa would get a new sword.
27	3	"The Silver-Scale Curse"; Transliteration: "Ginrin no Noroi" (Japanese: 銀鱗の呪い)	Katsuya Ōshima	Katsuyuki Sumisawa	Katsuya Ōshima	October 16, 2021	August 14, 2022	
Jaken recalls fourteen years ago on how Rin met Zero, who had fatally cursed her with the binding spell coupled with a red thread of fate. Since she had her as leverage over Sesshōmaru, she demanded to know about her daughters. Rin learns that she will die, if the silver-scale curse spreads through her body. Out of options, Jaken places Rin inside the Sacred Tree of Ages, whose infinite time-based powers would assist in reducing a rapid spread of Zero's curse by keeping Rin within her current state of suspended animation. The spirit instructed Jaken to put a portion of the sacred Dream Butterfly on Setsuna, in which her dreams and sleep would be transferred to Rin, preserve her life and temporarily stop the curse. In the feudal era's current timeline, the Half-Demon Princesses meet Bokusenō and retrieve a mystical Kyūyōkon Root. He informs them that the root of power originated from Mount Musubi, but neglects to mention the magical barrier protecting it. The girls reach to the mountain and wonder what awaits them. A transparent young red-haired girl sleeps deeply on a pale green glowing scale inside the mountain.
28	4	"The Barrier at Mount Musubi"; Transliteration: "Musubi Yama no Kekkai" (Japanese: 産霊山の結界)	Mitsuhiro Yoneda	Katsuyuki Sumisawa	Mitsuhiro Yoneda	October 23, 2021	August 21, 2022	
Near away from the mountain, Jaken and Sesshōmaru learn about the demon girl Rion sealed away for six centuries. The girls become separated, but Moroha is capable of entering through the spiritual energy shield, due to possessing spiritual powers. Rion tells Moroha to find Towa and Setsuna, but only if she is willing to release what she holds. Moroha breaks through with the sacred arrow, and enters the border between the real world and the afterlife, where she recognizes her paternal grandfather. Inuyasha and Kagome Higurashi are still trapped in the graveyard. He tells her that the fang of his mighty Tessaiga is stirring, because it tries to tell him something important. As the spirit of Moroha hovers through there, her scared arrows become restless and becomes emotional upon seeing her parents, whom she recognizes from the picture that Sōta had shown her a few months ago. They delay their reunion. Meanwhile, Towa hears the voice of Osamu Kirin, who informs her that she must release the past. Setsuna is taken to the Sacred Tree of Ages and she meets Rin within the unparalleled time-based entity very core. Setsuna recalls how the song she plays her lullaby was a memory that only her body could recall, realizing that she must have learned it from the woman she saw. The Sacred Tree of Ages asks Setsuna how she felt getting to meet Rin, explaining how Rin has not aged since hidden within it for fourteen years since she gave birth to Towa and Setsuna, which had been aided by the elderly low-level miko Kaede, uppermost-level priestess Kagome, and retired master demon-slayer Sango.
29	5	"The Girl Named Rion"; Transliteration: "Rion to Iu Na no Shōjo" (Japanese: りおんという名の少女)	Ayumu Ono	Katsuyuki Sumisawa	Ayumu Ono	October 30, 2021	August 28, 2022	
The Half-Demon Princesses learn that Rion had died six centuries ago, but had her soul perpetually bound to her father Kirinmaru. With her will to stop Kirinmaru and bring forth the Degenerate Age foretold by the Sacred Tree of Ages, he visited every corner of this world, except for the modern era where Kagome and Towa once lived, so Kirinmaru plans to capture a spirit named Akuru to move the Windmill of Time, that the world of the living will come to an end, Rion sustains her soul within her body. Towa receives the ancient Star-Slicer Flute transforming into the magical sword, Zanseiken. In ancient times, Amatsumikaboshi, the God of Stars, gifted the two swords. With it separated from another twin sword Bakuseiken, the Half-Demon Princesses prepare for battle. Sesshōmaru kills the dream butterfly, so Setsuna can dream and sleep, but Rin's curse continues progressing. Riku and Rion leave the girls behind.
30	6	"Hisui the Demon Slayer"; Transliteration: "Taijiya Hisui" (Japanese: 退治屋翡翠)	Takashi Mamezuka	Hiroko Kanasugi	Toshihiko Masuda	November 6, 2021	September 4, 2022	
Having recovered the ability to sleep after a whole decade, Setsuna is abducted by ninjas sent by Princess Aiya and her father. Aiya coerces Setsuna to take their lesson, as Aiya leaves the palanquin to enjoy her newfound freedom outside the castle. Setsuna discovers Hisui being the instructor and resembling Kin'u. Outside the castle, Hisui saves Aiya from a giant octopus. The Lord discovers his Aiya's duplicity and severely lectures her as Setsuna returns to the village. Setsuna does not inform Towa about her predicament, and leaves to train in further developing and increasing her nagianta's magical ability, and unique techniques to their full strength. Lost in thought and still uncertain about the fact that saving Rin from Zero's curse is up to her alone, Setsuna goes to the Sacred of Ages and plays a lullaby for Rin.
31	7	"Takechiyo's Request"; Transliteration: "Takechiyo no Irai" (Japanese: 竹千代の依頼)	Akira Toba	Katsuyuki Sumisawa	Atsuo Tobe	November 13, 2021	September 11, 2022	
Towa and Setsuna encounter a giant earth-type rock demon, with the belief that destroying them will make him mighty. Before Towa uses Zanseiken, she hesitates as the demon feels guilty for actions. As Towa's overly kind heart and unwillingness to kill nearly gets her killed, Setsuna defeats the rock demon. As their adversary splits into three child-like earth demons and flee with the promise to attack again, Setsuna informs Towa that it may be best for her to return to the modern era, as she believes that she is perfectly capable of saving their mother Rin and stopping Kirinmaru. Elsewhere, Moroha disguises herself in front a set of four male demons in the shape of porcelain masks who inform her of just how strong and notorious her parents have become before she was born: Inuyasha defeated Naraku and Kagome having imprisoned a very powerful daiyōkai with an extraordinarily strong sealing arrow within the seven months she had lived in the feudal era. The four masks mock Moroha as she is only a quarter-demon but still think she is trouble. Annoyed, Moroha reveals herself and admits that she does not yet possess spiritual powers to equal those of her mother, but this statement causes the demon masks to open a portal to avoid being exorcised by her. Now that she knows that her parents' notorious feats are the reason why that business in slaying minor or major-league demons was declined regardless of her own reputation as "the Demon Killer". Takechiyo appears and informs Moroha that he has requested her help in his homeland, where Moroha meets the elder raccoon-dog Hachiemon, who tells her that he brought her to the village of Eastern Wolf-Demon Tribe under Inuyasha and Kagome.
32	8	"Nanahoshi's Mini Galaxy"; Transliteration: "Nanahoshi no Shōginga" (Japanese: 七星の小銀河)	Kento Nakagomi	Katsuyuki Sumisawa	Kazuo Terada	November 20, 2021	September 25, 2022	
Zero, disguised as Otsuyu, arrives at the mansion of a demon named Nanahoshi who feeds on the misery and anguish of others through his miniature galaxy. His power has no effect on Zero as she subdues him with her Rainbow Pearls to recruit him and set a trap for Towa. As Kohaku and his demon-slayers prepare for their mission to a village that requires their exceptional skills in wiping out a herd of fire bulls that have strayed from following the local deity, Mayonaka. Using the lavender-scented hand cream that Towa had given her to soften her dry hands, Setsuna glimpses the childlike demon spirit Akuru as Towa had earlier as Riku and Rion had come to request their assistance in accompanying her as Zero is after her very life, and those for Setsuna and Moroha. Having been caught by the Raccoon-Dog Tribe, Moroha uses a Swiss Army knife to escape the dungeon. Hiding in the ceiling and trying to retrieve her weapons, Moroha learns that Takechiyo has a younger brother, whose father had his forehead scarred by Inuyasha while his comrade, the Full Moon Raccoon-Dog, was defeated and imprisoned in a scroll by Kagome's arrow, which explains the whole Raccoon-Dog Tribe's fury and hatred towards Moroha. Pursued by raccoon-dog demons, Moroha tries to fight them off with her Crimson Dragon Wave, but it was proven ineffective. Now facing the very foes that her parents had defeated, who are bent on returning the favor, Moroha takes out her grandmother's rouge to boost her strength and skills even further with her new-and-improved Beniyasha form since her battle with Kirinmaru to avenge her beloved half-cousin's recent death. She attacks with her temporarily enhanced Crimson Backlash Wave, but her adversaries do not seem worried in the slightest which she comes to realize.
33	9	"Mayonaka the Visitor"; Transliteration: "Mayonaka no Hōmonsha" (Japanese: 魔夜中の訪問者)	Hidekazu Hara	Katsuyuki Sumisawa	Hidekazu Hara	November 27, 2021	October 2, 2022	
Riku utilizes Towa's lavender-scented hand cream to fix his eyes, which turn them from dark green to a light lavender. He claims that this is a good thing as Kirinmaru will no longer see exactly where they are anymore though his eyes. At Mamidaira Island, Moroha is defeated by the two-rogue raccoon-dogs, despite her bragging that her evolved Beniyasha form was now "new and improved." Takechiyo and Hachi take shelter in a cave as Moroha sleeps from the use of her deceased paternal grandmother's shell rouge once more. Still continuing their expedition in Gokoku Village, the Demon-Slayers try to find a way to stop the Flame Bulls and finally appease their master Mayonaka the "demon god" deity. Setsuna learns about Mayonaka that he was betrayed by the villagers and the headman's daughter, Oharu. Wanting to help him move on from his sorrow, Setsuna utilizes her naginata to cut Mayonaka's light golden thread of fate from his treasured possession, the Blessing of the Five Grains. Once she does, the shine crumples to reveal Oharu's body (who had used as a sacrifice), shocking Mayonaka. Knowing what had transpired, he hugs his human love and leaves with her spirit to enter heaven. As the demon-slayers depart, Setsuna senses a strange sensation and wonders what it could be.
34	10	"Battle on the New Moon, Part 1"; Transliteration: "Kessen no Saku (Zenpen)" (Japanese: 決戦の朔（前編）)	Kei Umabiki	Katsuyuki Sumisawa	Kei Umabiki	December 4, 2021	October 9, 2022	
Moroha, Takechiyo, and Hachiemon are on their way to recover her equipment from the rogue raccoon-dog Shōgen Mamaiana, and take shelter in a cave. In the inn, Setsuna is hauled up as she experiences what is like to be fully mortal for the first time in an entire decade. Her already long black hair growing to nearly reach her caves and her eyes turning from blue to brown. Knowing how useless she is, Setsuna gives Hisui written instructions on how to deal with the demons that have come for. While building a hang guilder, Hachiemon tells Moroha the story about how the Shōgen and Full Moon Raccoon-Dog, the guardian spirit of the whole tribe, were defeated by Inuyasha, Kagome, Miroku, and Sango. Inuyasha wounds Shōgen with the scar on his forehead. With help from Hachiemon, Kagome immobilizes the Full Moon Raccoon-Dog in a pillar of mighty spiritual power and have him fully absorbed within a scroll which was later strengthened by Miroku. Wanting more information on how to put an end to this feud, Moroha has Takamaru the Falcon find either Miroku or Sango, to ask just how Shōgen and his demonic magic were defeated. Meanwhile, an equally powerless Towa expresses her deep concerns over Setsuna, knowing the effects of the new moon since her Dream Butterfly fell. She is later abducted and taken to Nanaoshi's mansion, where Zero attempts to use what Towa has learned from seeing her memories within the Silver Rainbow Pearl, and that she had something within her left eye for a whole decade to help Nanahoshi further his own power by feasting on her enduring sadness and unpredictability.
35	11	"Battle on the New Moon, Part 2"; Transliteration: "Kessen no Saku (Kōhen)" (Japanese: 決戦の朔（後編）)	Takashi Mamezuka	Katsuyuki Sumisawa	Toshihiko Masuda	December 11, 2021	October 16, 2022	
A thoroughly powerless Towa finds herself at the mercy of Zero and Nanahoshi, who attempts to strengthen his extraordinary powers by feeding on her enduring sorrow and unpredictability by using an eternity bug on her, giving Zero a greater advantage. Setsuna trusts that Hisui and the other demon-slayers to take care of the snow demons who are after her. Meanwhile, Moroha helps the Raccoon-Dog Clan exile Shogen from the island, in order to pay off her debt. Moroha declines it, saying she has spent time on her job.
36	12	"A Place (Not) for Towa"; Transliteration: "Towa ni Nai Basho" (Japanese: 永遠(とわ)にない場所)	Katsuya Ōshima	Katsuyuki Sumisawa	Katsuya Ōshima	December 18, 2021	October 23, 2022	
Abducted by Zero and subjected to Nanhoshi, Towa inadvertently recalls her past in the modern era, when she was rejected by bullies for her "albino-like" appearance and lying about having a sister. However, Zero torments Towa further by revealing Sestuna's memory, and Towa kills Nanahoshi once her demonic powers return. Riku learns that Zero forced Towa to suffer pain and guilt. Riku stops Towa, as Zero absorbs the Rainbow Pearls with the intent to send herself, Rin and Towa to Hell. Meanwhile, Sesshōmaru finds Kohaku's group and Setsuna cannot free Rin from the Sacred Tree of Ages, after being informed about Zero and Towa.
37	13	"Zero's Wish"; Transliteration: "Zero no Omoi" (Japanese: 是露の想い)	Mitsuhiro Yoneda	Katsuyuki Sumisawa	Mitsuhiro Yoneda	December 25, 2021	November 6, 2022	
Zero reveals the truth that she is the mastermind behind the family separation. Kirinmaru follows Akuru. Setsuna arrives in time to stop Towa, reaching her with a Dream Butterfly Rin gave her. Towa and Setsuna see the truth a decade ago that she was inconsolable for her, until Jaken attached a Dream Butterfly at Rin's behest to relieve her over grievance. After embracing Setsuna and reverting to her normal self, Towa thanks Zero for helping her realize the love she had. Zero attempts to kill herself and Rin, but Setsuna cuts a second thread of fate connecting Zero's heart and the spirit of Tōga. This causes the Rainbow Pearls to vanish, as Zero once more feels regret over not preventing Tōga when the Shikon Jewel revealed it to her, only for Tōga to console her while expressing his gratitude for her remaining who she is. Now at peace and ready to pass on, Zero severs the thread of fate, before Riku kills her. Zero tells Setsuna and Towa that Kirinmaru's hatred of humans, as the samurai by the orders of Emperor who tried to kill him were no match for him, and half-demons came from the fact that one such being, by the name Sakasa, who killed Rion in retribution for his master. She dies afterwards, hoping to see her younger brother in nirvana someday. The silver-scale curse is lifted, and Sesshōmaru frees Rin from the Sacred Tree of Ages. When Kirinmaru steals the Black Pearl, Moroha makes an ultimatum between saving her parents or stealing the pinwheel.
38	14	"Kirinmaru of the Dawn"; Transliteration: "Shinonome no Kirinmaru" (Japanese: 東雲の麒麟丸)	Ayumu Ono	Katsuyuki Sumisawa	Ayumu Ono	January 8, 2022	November 13, 2022	
Kirinmaru tells Moroha that Akuru has been around since the Age of the Gods in which she saw him again as she remembered what Rion said back at Mount Musubi. Kirinmaru overwhelms Moroha, when she tries to retrieve the Black Pearl. Having been reverted, Rin and Jaken stay at the Sacred Tree of Ages, while Sesshōmaru enters the battle. Towa and Setsuna leave the mansion, visit Rin, and meet up with Moroha. Sesshōmaru distracts Kirinmaru in a battle causing the very earth and heavens to resound once again. Meanwhile, Rion makes the decision that if Kirinmaru dies, so does Riku, being his incarnation made from his broken right horn. Riku is not worried, as he has been prepared for such a moment for some time, and that he had spent with Towa. To further assist Rion in her mission, she asks Riku to return to Mount Musubi. Rin and Jaken exit the Sacred Tree of Ages, before Sesshōmaru has taken the hit for the girls when they provoked Kirimaru to unleash his immensely powerful and lethal Demon Fireball attack, which gradually begins to drain him of his very lifeblood essence (haku), but after Sesshōmaru uses the Black Pearl to send the Half-Demon Princesses into the realm. The injured Sesshōmaru manages to mask his presence as his haku is gradually drained from him. At the Border of the Afterlife near Tōga's tomb, Moroha reunites with Inuyasha and Kagome, confirming she was separated from them when she was an infant.
39	15	"Moroha and Family, Together Again"; Transliteration: "Oyako no Saikai" (Japanese: 親子の再会)	Akira Toba	Katsuyuki Sumisawa	Terry	January 15, 2022	November 20, 2022	
Towa and Setsuna conclude that Kagome is their aunt and Inuyasha is their uncle. The couple tells their daughter that they never raised her. Back in the physical world, Jaken and Rin find Sesshōmaru, whose haku is drained away due to Kirinmaru's attack that he had taken for the girls. Setsuna wonders how Inuyasha and Kagome recognized Moroha, to which they show the twins the Lake of the Staff of Two Heads. From time to time, they manage to see images of Moroha via Jaken's staff. Upon learning how Towa saved Setsuna, Inuyasha realizes that Tenseiga is the key to returning to the real world. Kirinmaru prepares to attack Rin, but Sesshōmaru manages to retaliate in spite of his weakened state. Kirinmaru explains of how the Grim Comet will return in full five centuries from now and that he intends to prove to Akuru that he is the strongest of all sentient beings. When asked how he can foresee the apocalypse occurring within the distant future, Kirinmaru reveals that he used his right arm to create Osamu Kirin, another offshoot-incarnation, and Towa realizes the truth.
40	16	"The Three Princesses Escape"; Transliteration: "Sanhime no Dasshutsu" (Japanese: 三姫の脱出)	Kento Nakagomi	Katsuyuki Sumisawa	Atsuo Tobe	January 22, 2022	December 4, 2022	
Rin and Jaken take Sesshōmaru to the Sacred Tree of Ages, while waiting for Towa and Setsuna. Meanwhile, Shippō and Takechiyo head to the village of the demon-slayers, and reunite with Sango. Takechiyo explains that Inuyasha and Kagome were trapped in the realm within the Black Pearl, prompting Sango to realize that the time to utilize the Black Hiraikotsu has finally come. Towa manages to summon Tenseiga, but it is embedded in the pedestal that it was once in all those centuries ago. Towa, Setsuna and Moroha remove Tessaiga from the pedestal. They escape the Border of the Afterlife. Moroha keeps the Black Pearl within Izayoi's rouge, and Rin reunites with Setsuna and Towa for the first time, with Jaken reminding them about Sesshōmaru. Towa utilizes the supreme power of the Kyūyōkon Root within Zanseiken to absorb all of the Demon Fireball's vast stellar energy. Despite Sesshōmaru's warning, Towa falls unconscious.
41	17	"Akuru's Pinwheel"; Transliteration: "Akuru no Kazaguruma" (Japanese: 阿久留のかざぐるま)	Naoki Kotani	Katsuyuki Sumisawa	Naoki Kotani	January 29, 2022	December 11, 2022	
Akuru heals Towa with the pinwheel, and the Sacred Tree of Ages' essence appears to inform Towa and Setsuna that they and Moroha have been chosen by Akuru to destroy the Grim Comet, and the "anomaly" in the modern era. Rin tells her twin daughters that they must finish when they started. The twins assure her that they will return and leave with Jaken to use the Windmill of Time to go to the modern era with the aid from their dog-demon grandmother. At the Bone-Eater's Well, Moroha receives a longbow made from materials from her grandfather's tomb and Inuyasha's silver hair. Kagome tells Moroha that the Bone-Eater's Well is where she came from to the feudal era, that it is a very special place for her and Inuyasha. The family reunion is interrupted by the reappearance of Kirinmaru who demands Sesshōmaru, only to decide the massacre the Dog Clan and everyone they know when Moroha and her parents fight him. Towa and Sestuna arrive with Akuru, telling Moroha to join them, while Inuyasha and Kagome distract Kirinmaru.
42	18	"The Collapse of the Windmill of Time"; Transliteration: "Hōkai Suru Toki no Fūsha" (Japanese: 崩壊する時の風車)	Akira Toba	Katsuyuki Sumisawa	Atsuo Tobe, Tetsuji Nakamura, Naoki Kotani	February 5, 2022	December 18, 2022	
The Half-Demon Princesses meet Sesshōmaru's noble dog-demon mother at her palace, who tells them that they can go the Windmill of Time and the doorway of time should open for them. To test them further, she summons Meidomaru of the Wrath of the Underworld. Near Mount Musubi, Kirinmaru uses his Bakuseiken to replenish Rion's haku so she can move again. He informs her and Riku about his dream to travel to the modern era and "save" humanity by destroying the Grim Comet. Rion refuses as accomplishing such a feat would bring about the Degenerate Age in the feudal era. Her father assures her that he has started procuring a new body for her: Towa. The Half-Demon Princesses have trouble holding off Meidomaru as he is connected to multiple threads of fate due the grudges belonging to the many demons he had absorbed. With her new longbow, Moroha's enhanced sacred arrow now enables her to break one's weapon and weaken them greatly, allowing his threads of fate to be seen by Towa. She uses the Zanseiken to absorb his demonic energies, which her grandmother recognizes as "the Sword of Amatsumikaboshi", and Setsuna cuts his threads of fate. Rion is shocked at what she has done to Towa, and Riku furiously engages in battle with Kirinmaru, stating that he would sacrifice his artificial life for Towa. Using her late aunt's staff, Rion holds her father off, but accidentally runs Riku through with it, deeply devastating her. Kirinmaru subdues and abducts Rion, flying off in pursuit of the Half-Demon Princesses. Having passed their grandmother's test, the girls are told of the curse placed on Zanseiken and that its owner will eventually inhabit Towa's body should her kon be further drained. Towa vows to master Zanseiken, to which her grandmother says that she can do she sees fit. Akuru presents the pinwheel to Towa, who opens a time portal in one of the Windmill of Time's gears to return to the modern era. Close at hand, Kirinmaru summons Osamu to lead him to the future as hordes of demons come from the Windmill of Time. Within the Sacred Tree of Ages, Rin senses something big has just occurred. As they travel through the rainbow corridor, Towa vows that after destroying the Grim Comet, she will uphold the promise she made for Rin about returning home.
43	19	"The Blackout"; Transliteration: "Anten no Sutēji" (Japanese: 暗転の舞台(ステージ))	Mitsuhiro Yoneda	Katsuyuki Sumisawa	Terry	February 12, 2022	January 8, 2023	
The girls return to the modern era, and reunite with Mei, her paternal grandmother, and paternal great-grandfather. They inform them of the Grim Comet and leave to find Osamu Kirin. He explains his admiration for how humanity has evolved on its own and that he wants to ensure their survival as they will remain utterly oblivious to their sudden extinction. The girls go to warn Moe about the danger, but she brushes it off and performs as the violinist. Stuck in the rift on both eras, Kirinmaru orders Osamu to lead there as hordes of demons attack. That night, the girls and Osamu arrive at Tokyo Tower to prepare fighting the Grim Comet.
44	20	"When the Grim Comet Falls"; Transliteration: "Yōreisei ga Ochiru Toki" (Japanese: 妖霊星が墜ちる時)	Takashi Mamezuka	Katsuyuki Sumisawa	Takashi Mamezuka	February 26, 2022	January 15, 2023	
At the top of the tower, the Half-Demon Princesses and Osamu try to obliterate the Grim Comet, but it is far too vast and powerful. Osamu plunges right into its heart and discovers its true self as a pale blue glowing substance. Once declaring that he eradicated all demons, Kirinmaru's additional incarnation manages to use his mighty demonic powers to make the Comet follow him all the way to the feudal era in order to fulfill Kirinmaru's wish in destroying it. Osamu reunites with Kirinmaru and reveals the images of the modern world certain that Rion would love them. As hordes of demons keep appearing the attack, Kaede holds her own against them for awhile with Inuyasha, Kagome and Shippō as back up. Miroku manages to purify several hordes with his immensely stronger and spiritual powers as Sango exterminates another with her Black Hiraikotsu, which is strong enough to purify their energy as it has been infused with Kin'u's own developing Buddhist powers. After reaching Mount Musubi, Rion asks for it to infuse her with the vast mystical strength of the Kyūyōkon Root. Rion plants the apple seed and it grows into an apple tree, leaving one glowing green apple for her. Still within the Sacred Tree of Ages, a worried Rin watches Sesshōmaru, while praying for Towa and Setsuna. Back in the modern era, the Half-Demon Princesses realize that Osamu plans to kill all demons, knowing Sesshōmaru and Inuyasha are in danger. The girls head to the shrine and ask the Sacred Tree of Ages to open the gateway to the past, but it does not answer.
45	21	"Osamu Kirin's Apparition Conquest"; Transliteration: "Kirin Osamu no Ayakashi Seibatsu" (Japanese: 希林理の妖征伐)	Katsuya Ōshima	Katsuyuki Sumisawa	Katsuya Ōshima	March 5, 2022	January 22, 2023	
The Half-Demon Princesses decide to ask on the next day for the Sacred Tree of Ages to open the gateway to the feudal era, so they can save their families. Sōta tells Towa that he will always think of her as his biological daughter, and that the decade they had together was the joyous years of his and Moe's lives. Towa assures a weeping Mei that she will remember her always. Moe tells Setsuna to keep it up with the lullaby, which the girls promise. Akuru opens the portal on the Sacred Tree's trunk, albeit with some difficulty, before fading away. Mei assures Towa that she will not cry, and that the half-demon girl does not need to worry about her anymore. As the portal closes, Moe assures her husband that they will someday see them again, which Sōta agrees. Back in the feudal era, the girls are shocked at just how massive and imitinidating the Grim Comet become. Towa wonders exactly what her homeroom teacher is after, as Inuyasha and Kagome arrive to inform the girls about other demons being absorbed by the true form of the Grim Comet: the Grim Butterfly. Osamu senses the presence of Riku, his "younger brother" as both are Kirinmaru's incarnations, and prepares to achieve his goal. As Riku holds off demons, Rion approaches her father who is asleep after fighting Osamu. Seeing this as an opportunity, Rion holds the Kyūyōkon apple to suppress Kirinmaru's immense demonic powers, but is approached by Osamu. He expresses his happiness at finally meeting her, reminding her that he is the right arm that Tōga of the West had cut off six centuries ago. He assures Rion that he will help her construct a peaceful world, in which she no longer have to suffer. Conflicted, Rion allows Osamu to fly off with her, and they become linked with the Grim Butterfly via threads, a feat that will ensure Osamu's immortality. He offers Riku the same, but he declines as it is not what he desires to achieve, even for Towa's sake. Having regained conscious, Kirinmaru witnesses Rion being absorbed into the Grim Butterfly and flies to tear it open in a desperate attempt to reach his beloved daughter. Towa receives a genuine Kikujūmonji from Kohaku and Hisui as a replacement. Sesshōmaru wakes up and leaves the Sacred Tree of Ages, before making a duel with Kirinmaru for the final time. Sesshōmaru tells Rin to watch him as he fights Kirinmaru, to which Rin assures Sesshōmaru will win.
46	22	"The Grim Butterfly of Despair"; Transliteration: "Zetsubō no Yōrei Chō" (Japanese: 絶望の妖霊蝶)	Ayumu Ono	Katsuyuki Sumisawa	Masakazu Hishida	March 12, 2022	January 29, 2023	
The group enters inside the Grim Butterfly's interior, with Setsuna and Moroha proceeding to help Rion, Towa clashes with Osamu. As Riku was about to tell Towa on what Rion is, Osamu tells him to be silent as Riku gets trapped into spider webs dragging him all the way up to the ceiling. Outside of the interior of the Grim Butterfly, Kirinmaru states on how long he has waited for this as Sesshōmaru says how pitiful he is as their swords clash. Setsuna and Moroha attempt to stop Rion from making a selfish wish. Osamu uses the Zanseiken to drain Towa's power, and prepares to kill her with the final blow.
47	23	"Father and Daughter"; Transliteration: "Chichi to Ko to" (Japanese: 父と娘と)	Masakazu Hishida	Katsuyuki Sumisawa	Atsuo Tobe	March 19, 2022	February 5, 2023	
To defeat Osamu, Towa restores her ability and destroys Kirinmaru's right arm. The dying Riku vanishes from existence, leaving Kirinmaru's small horn. Towa overcomes her grief, and reunites with Setsuna and Moroha. Sesshōmaru and Kirinmaru continues to clash with Sesshōmaru taunting Kirinmaru that he is acting more like a human. As Kirinmaru was about to land a hit on Sesshōmaru, Sesshōmaru defeats Kirinmaru, unable to see it coming as the battle continues. Towa uses the Zanseiken for the final time to save Rion. Towa tells the others to carve their own fate as she uses the sword's power to save Rion from her regretful past and Osamu, as she offers her body to her. Rion is now freed from her past and Osamu, but at the cost of Towa's mind as she collapses which worries Setsuna and Moroha that they truly will never see their warm-hearted relative again. Rion fuses into Towa's body, as it disappears with Rion herself still remains. Defeated and overwhelmed by Sesshōmaru, Kirinmaru is sent up to the Grim Butterfly's interior and is reunited with Rion. He apologizes to her for everything as they bonded again. Setsuna cuts the red thread of fate between Rion and Kirinmaru. They apologize to the half demon girls for all the events that have transpired between them. As Kirinmaru and Rion die peacefully, Zanseiken and Bakuseiken meld into a single sword, Amatsumikaboshi, and as a result of this Towa is revived once again. The others on the ground see the Grim Butterfly disappear from the sky. Towa, Setsuna, and Moroha are congratulated by their families, while having their peaceful lives.
48	24	"A Never-Ending Future"; Transliteration: "Towa ni Tsuzuku Mirai" (Japanese: 永遠(とわ)に続く未来)	Mitsuhiro Yoneda, Takashi Mamezuka, Ken'ichi Domon	Katsuyuki Sumisawa	Terry, Atsuo Tobe	March 26, 2022	February 5, 2023	
Peace has returned to the feudal era. The spirit notices that the girls and Sesshōmaru had succeeded the mission, she is transferred back into the Tree of Ages. Moroha pays off all of her debts with Jyūbei and is free to go on her own ventures. It is revealed later that day that Riku was somehow revived, thanks to the power of the magical sword, and requests the assistance of the half-demon princesses to embark on to the west to deal with demons of both low and high rank causing trouble, now that the balance of power has shifted due to Kirinmaru's demise, by traveling to the western lands that were once ruled by their grandfather.

== Home media release ==
=== Japanese ===
Aniplex+ (Japan – Region 2/A)
Box	Episodes	Release date	Ref.
3	25–36	March 2, 2022	
4	37–48	June 8, 2022	

=== English ===
Viz Media (North America – Region 1/A)
Part		Episodes	Regular edition release date	Limited edition release date	Ref.
Season 2	1	25–36	March 28, 2023		
Season 2	2	37–48	September 26, 2023		
