= Fandango (streaming service) =

Digital video store and streaming service

- Formerly: Vudu (2005–2024); Fandango at Home (2024–2026)
- Type: Subsidiary
- Industry: Entertainment
- Founded: 2004; 22 years ago
- Founders: Alain Rossmann; Tony Miranz
- Headquarters: Beverly Hills, California, United States
- Area served: United States
- Services: Video on demand
- Parent: Fandango Media
- Website: Fandango

Fandango (formerly known as Vudu and Fandango at Home, and alternatively known as Fandango Stream) is an American digital video store and streaming service owned by Fandango Media, a joint-venture 75% owned by Versant, while Skydance retains the remaining 25%. The company offers transactional video on demand rentals and digital purchases of films, as well as integration with digital locker services for streaming digital copies of films purchased as home video at retail.

When Vudu was founded in 2004, the company initially focused developing a digital media player known as the Vudu Box. In 2010, Vudu began to abandon its hardware business and focused on integrating its service and associated app platform into third-party devices such as televisions and Blu-ray Disc players. The company has since offered its services online, via mobile apps, and on devices such as digital media players and smart TVs.

In 2010, Vudu was sold to Walmart. In 2020, Fandango Media acquired Vudu for an undisclosed amount. While initially maintaining the Vudu name due to brand recognition, Fandango Media nevertheless rebranded the service under the Fandango brand in 2024. In 2026, the "at Home" was dropped from the name with the service rebranding simply as Fandango.

== History ==
Vudu was founded by Tony Miranz and Alain Rossmann (the creator of the Wireless Application Protocol). The Vudu Box had been secretly in development since 2004, but in April 2007, The New York Times revealed Vudu had signed deals with several movie studios and independent distributors to deliver access to nearly 5,000 films.

As of April 2007, Vudu had received $21 million in venture capital funding from Greylock Partners and Benchmark Capital. The company is based in Santa Clara, California.

In May 2008, Vudu began displaying and selling its set-top box in Best Buy stores. Before this, the box was only available via online retailers. In October, Vudu announced that it would begin to stream films in 1080p high definition, branded as "HDX". These films would feature a series of encoding and processing techniques branded as "TruFilm", including the dampening of artifacting and pixelation associated with darker areas of pictures, film grain preservation, "color gradient processing" to improve appearance on flat-panel televisions, and "statistical variable bitrate" to optimize streaming performance.

On February 24, 2009, Vudu became the first on-demand service to offer high-definition movies for download to own. Prior to Vudu allowing users to purchase high-definition movies, studios only allowed their films to be purchased in standard-definition format. LG was the first to integrate Vudu into its HDTVs, with access beginning in August 2009 through the television's NetCast application.

On January 8, 2010, at Consumer Electronics Show, Vudu announced that it would phase out its in-house hardware business in favor of focusing on integration of its rich Internet application platform, "Vudu Apps" (which featured Vudu as well as other streaming video and internet services), directly into internet-connected televisions and Blu-ray players, with initial hardware partners including LG, Magnavox, Mitsubishi, Samsung, Sanyo, Sharp, Toshiba, and Vizio.

On February 22, 2010, Walmart announced its intent to acquire Vudu. The company had previously attempted to offer digital video sales in 2007, but the service folded due to competition with the iTunes Store. To comply with Walmart's content policies, Vudu subsequently discontinued its "After Dark" service (a collaboration with AVN), which offered pornographic content.

In 2012, Vudu partnered with UltraViolet, an industry-backed digital locker offering online streaming of retail DVD and Blu-ray disc purchases. In 2014, Vudu also joined Disney's competing Movies Anywhere initiative.

In February 2020, it was reported that Comcast (via NBCUniversal) had entered talks into acquiring Vudu from Walmart.

Vudu 2014 logo with Fandango byline

In April 2020, it was announced that NBCUniversal subsidiary Fandango Media would acquire Vudu for an undisclosed amount; the sale closed on July 6, 2020. Fandango is minority owned by Warner Bros., and operated the similar service FandangoNow. As part of the sale, Walmart will maintain its relationships with Vudu, including account integration and promotion of the service via Walmart's website.

On August 3, 2021, FandangoNow was merged into Vudu. Fandango chose to retain the "Vudu" name as it was the larger service and had better brand recognition. As a result of a prior agreement with Roku, Inc. inherited from Fandango acquisition M-Go, Vudu would also become the official digital media storefront of Roku digital media players.

In June 2023, AMC Theatres (which has been a long-time partner of Fandango's online movie ticketing service) announced that Vudu would subsume its AMC Theatres On Demand service, with its library being transferred to the platform and upgraded to higher quality formats where applicable. Users would be able to migrate to Vudu through August 31, 2023.

On February 16, 2024, it was announced that the service would be rebranded as "Fandango at Home" to unify it with its parent company. This took effect March 12, 2024. In 2026, the "at Home" was dropped from the name with the service rebranding simply as Fandango.

== Content ==
As of June 2019, Vudu's selection contains over 24,000 titles in their catalog and over 8,000 television shows. Titles range from major motion pictures, independent films, documentaries, children's programming, anime, musicals, recorded musical performances, cartoons, and television series. Vudu has established content licensing contracts with all major movie studios as well as over 50 smaller and independent studios. Films are available to rent in standard-definition, high-definition, and 4K ultra high definition formats, with Dolby Atmos, Dolby Vision, and HDR10 available on supported devices and content.

In October 2016, Vudu added a free, ad-supported streaming library to its platform in the United States branded as "Movies on Us", featuring recent and classic films.

In October 2018, Vudu partnered with MGM Television to develop and acquire original programming for Movies on Us, with a focus on "family-friendly, advertiser-friendly content" derived from existing MGM properties. Vudu premiered its first original series, Mr. Mom—a continuation of the 1983 film of the same name, on September 12, 2019.

In July 2026, Versant announced that Fandango would broadcast German Bundesliga matches in the United States as part of a five-year deal with USA Sports, marking the platform's first venture into sports broadcasting. Fandango will also stream all matches from the 2026 edition of World TeamTennis which will also air on Versant owned CNBC.

== See also ==
- Over-the-top media service
- Interactive television
- Internet television
