= David Maher =

American computer scientist

- Education: Ph.D., Lehigh University
- Occupations: Chief Technology Officer, Intertrust Technologies Corporation

David Maher is a computer scientist and the chief technology officer and executive vice president of Intertrust Technologies. He is also a Bell Labs Fellow and was chief architect for AT&T's STU-III secure voice, data and video products used by the White House and the United States Department of Defense.

== Life ==
David Maher joined Intertrust Technologies in 1999 as the chief technology officer. Prior to joining Intertrust, Maher worked at AT&T where he held several positions including Head of Secure Systems Research Department. Maher holds a Ph.D. in mathematics from Lehigh University.

Prior to joining Intertrust, Maher was the chief scientist for AT&T Secure Communications Systems. While at AT&T, he was the security architect for AT&T's Internet services platform as well as the chief architect for the STU-III secure voice, data and video products which have been used by the White House and the Department of Defense. Maher joined Bell Labs in 1981 and was recognized as a Bell Labs Fellow for his work there.

Maher has also taught electrical engineering, mathematics, and computer science at several institutions.
