= Flixster =

Former American movie website

Flixster, Inc.
- Company type: Subsidiary
- Website type: Social networking service
- Founded: January 20, 2006; 20 years ago
- Dissolved: February 20, 2018 (US); October 31, 2019 (Internationally)
- Founders: Joe Greenstein; Saran Chari
- Services: Film, social networking
- Employees: 75
- Parent: Fandango Media
- Website: flixster.com
- Launched: January 20, 2006

Flixster was a North American social-networking movie website for discovering new movies, learning about movies, and meeting others with similar tastes in movies. It is currently owned by Fandango Media. The formerly independent site allowed users to view movie trailers as well as learn about new and upcoming movies at the box office. It was originally based in San Francisco and was founded by Joe Greenstein and Saran Chari on January 20, 2006. It was also the former parent company of Rotten Tomatoes from January 2010 to February 17, 2016. On February 17, 2016, Flixster, including Rotten Tomatoes, was acquired by Fandango.

== History ==
In February 2016, Fandango acquired Flixster and began migrating Flixster Video users to its competing service called "FandangoNow" then closing the Flixster Video service. On August 28, 2017, Flixster shut down its digital redemption and streaming video service and directed customers to use Vudu. On December 22, 2017, the company sent an email to customers saying that it would cease all operations in the U.S. as of February 20, 2018. Starting in late January 2018, visitors to Flixster.com were encouraged to download the Flixster app or were redirected to Fandango.com. They were also directed to continue watching videos and redeeming digital codes via Vudu.

In February 2018, the Flixster website was no longer functioning and directed users to Fandango.com. Flixster Video's website and mobile apps, including UltraViolet code redemption, streaming, and downloading services are still available in other countries such as Canada. Flixster account holders would later have any of their purchased content sent to its competitor Vudu.

In June 2019, Flixster announced that it would shut down its streaming video services in all countries in which Flixster Video operates outside of the U.S. on October 31, 2019, due to the shutdown of UltraViolet. Customers in those areas were asked to transfer their content to Google Play, although Flixster warned users that due to rights restrictions, not all videos purchased on a Flixster library would be transferable depending on country.

== Site information ==
Between November 2006 and January 2007, the number of daily page views reported for Flixster by Alexa Toolbar users rose from fewer than 20 million to around 50 million. Quantcast reported that the number of global daily page views for Flixster.com peaked at 8,331,961 on January 23, 2008, and dropped to 1,325,685 by July 5, 2008. Alexa stopped reporting daily page views as of June 2008; the number of page views for Flixster as a percentage decreased by nearly two-thirds from mid-December 2007 to mid-June 2008.

Flixster's Facebook application, Movies, was consistently one of the most popular apps on the site; its daily user totals peaked in December 2007. By September 2010, its popularity had waned significantly; its 2.98 million monthly active users placed the Movies app as the ninth most-used entertainment application on Facebook and 92nd among apps overall.

Date	Active Daily Users
December 4, 2007	> 800,000
June 19, 2008	482,542
July 15, 2008	412,401

Flixster Collections, a desktop application featuring a content discovery and management system, began open beta testing on August 4, 2011.

== Marketing practices ==
Flixster's growth was described in the trade press as attributable to "its aggressive viral marketing practices," including "the automated selection of your email account's entire address book in order to send a Flixster invitation to all of your contacts." Although the company claimed that the procedure was an industry standard used by other services, Flixster differed in that its system automatically selected all contacts in the user's address book and required the user to manually un-select each address to prevent email from being sent to a user. Cofounder Joe Greenstein described the difference between Flixster and other sites as: "We make it easy to invite your friends. Other sites don't provide good ways for people to spread the word."

As a consequence of its policy of emailing users' entire address books with advertisements for the site, the website was criticized on numerous Internet blogs. At one point, email from Flixster to Hotmail users was being filtered and deleted as spam.

== Other supported platforms ==
The company allowed users to watch movies on several different platforms via UltraViolet.

=== Social media platforms ===
==== Bebo, Facebook, MySpace, Orkut ====
Flixster developed applications for several social networking sites. They had many of the same features as the main Flixster site including ratings, reviews, and user-generated quizzes. In addition, all offered social media integration and mobile app usage was offered free-of-charge, allowing more users to download it. The first of the apps was released in June 2007 on Facebook. In March 2008, a MySpace app followed which had 3,923,506 users as of July 2008. That made it the then-fourth most popular application on the MySpace platform. In addition, Flixster also developed applications for Bebo and Orkut.

=== Mobile and desktop platforms ===
==== Android, Blackberry, iOS, Windows Phone ====
In August 2008, Flixster released an iOS application which allowed users to access movie showtimes, reviews, and trailers. The iPhone and iPod app for Flixster was then the number one movie app on the platform. Flixster also released apps for Android mobile phones, Windows Phone, and BlackBerry phones. In August 2010, Flixster got to 20 million combined mobile app downloads and was ranked as the top movie app on iPhone, Android, and BlackBerry. In April 2014, Flixster's app was updated with Chromecast support allowing users to "cast" movies to a Chromecast-connected device. A streaming-only app, Flixster Video, was also released. The app handled only movie streaming, as the function was removed from the Movies by Flixster app.

In November 2017, the Flixster app was removed from all non-U.S. stores. It was later restored in 2018, though without support for finding local movie screening times.

== See also ==
- IMDb
- Moviefone
