= Marlin (DRM) =

Digital rights management scheme

Marlin is a DRM platform, created by an open-standards community initiative called the Marlin Developer Community (MDC). The MDC develops the necessary technology, partners, and services for enabling the creation of interoperable digital content distribution services.

Marlin technology provides capabilities for consumers to manage the relationships among devices, network services, and digital content. With Marlin, service providers and device markers can create and support content services over open networks.

== History ==
The MDC was formed in 2005 by five companies – Intertrust, Panasonic, Philips, Samsung and Sony. The MDC released the first set of specifications in May 2006. The Marlin Founders also formed the Marlin Trust Management Organization (MTMO) to act as a neutral trust management and licensing organization. The MTMO started commercial operations in January 2007.

== Technology ==
Marlin was created with specific design goals. First, Marlin allows consumer devices to import content from multiple independent services and accommodate peer-to-peer interactions. Second, Marlin is based on a general-purpose rights management architecture. Marlin specifications define the capabilities and architecture so that devices and services can interoperate.

Most Marlin implementations include the core system specification which defines the basic components, protocols, and consumer domain model that enable the interoperability between Marlin-enabled devices and services. This specification is based on the Octopus and NEMO reference technologies, which have been adapted for peer-to-peer device interactions.

The rights management within Marlin is based on Octopus which is a general-purpose DRM architecture. At the center of an Octopus system is a graph-based relationship engine. In Marlin, Octopus node objects are used to represent system entities (such as users and devices), and links between nodes represent relationships. The system of nodes and links manages where, how, and when content can be used in a Marlin system. Octopus runs on various platforms and is media format and cryptographically agnostic.

NEMO is an acronym for Networked Environment for Media Orchestration. It provides a services-based framework for trusted connections between various components of a Marlin DRM system. Based on Web Services standards, NEMO defines service interfaces, service access policies, and support for trust relationships among distributed entities that play well-defined and certified roles. The NEMO framework allows Marlin components to deliver protected messages and exchange them between authenticated and authorized entities. The services supported by NEMO may be operated together with other, application-specific media services that are not required to be NEMO-compliant.

== Products ==
Primary products for implementation of Marlin include:

- ExpressPlay: ExpressPlay is a hosted service provided by Intertrust and was introduced in May 2013. It is primarily designed to integrate Marlin content protection for Internet-based content distribution services. ExpressPlay provides a hosted Marlin server component for Marlin key management and a client-side SDK for iOS and Android.
- Bluewhale Marlin Broadband Server: The Bluewhale Marlin Broadband Server is a configurable implementation of a Marlin server providing the support necessary to secure the delivery of digital content to Marlin clients. In order to prepare appropriate information requested by clients, a Bluewhale server integrates with a service provider’s back-end business logic, using an XML-based interface. It translates the business logic into Marlin rights objects, creating and managing licenses and user registrations, for example.
- Bento4 Packager: The Bento4 Packager is a software tool for content packaging and parsing that works with Marlin clients. This tool packages, encrypts and protects content files at the server side. On the client side, the tool provides content decryption and parsing.
- Sushi Marlin Client SDK: The Sushi Marlin Client SDK is used to create client-side DRM functionality. This SDK provides the primary Marlin components necessary for determining license conditions and controlling access to protected content. It can be adapted for use in hardware devices and media playback and service access applications can also utilize it to provide DRM functionality. As of May 2013, Intertrust is no longer providing the Sushi Marlin Client SDK.

== Partners ==
In October 2008, the MDC announced the formation of the Marlin Partner Program (MPP) with an initial launch including over 25 companies. As of January 2014, the Marlin web site listed 42 partner companies.

Member partners identify, develop, and provide a variety of technical components and integration services creating a marketplace of Marlin solutions. Network operators, service providers, device manufacturers, and other companies deploying Marlin-based products and services can work with MPP member companies.

== Trust services ==
The technology is based upon open standards, but the security of the system is managed by an independent entity, the MTMO. The MTMO maintains the integrity and security of the system through its key management services.

== Deployment ==
Marlin is commercially deployed worldwide on a variety of devices and services.

Marlin is included in the national IPTV standard in Japan and has been deployed by Actvila, a web-based TV portal, launched in 2007. The Actvila service portal, created by partners Hitachi, Panasonic, Sharp, Sony, and Toshiba, included a roll-out of Internet-enabled TVs.

Sony uses Marlin in the PlayStation Network, allowing users of the video download service to share purchased or rented content on PS3, PS4, and PSP systems.

Televisions and Blu-ray players, which support the Philips Net TV service.

The Tencent online video service.

The following standard bodies have specified the use of Marlin in their specifications:

1. UltraViolet the digital rights authentication and cloud-based distribution system standard from the Digital Entertainment Content Ecosystem
2. The Open IPTV Forum

The following national initiatives have selected Marlin:

1. The Italian Internet TV services platform developed by the Tivu consortium
2. YouView the open Internet connected platform for the United Kingdom.
3. The TNT 2.0 specifications from the HD-Forum France.

Other consumer media services, such as Baidu-owned iQIYI and PPTV in China, have licensed Marlin.
