= The Last Sleepless City =

American pop punk band

- Origin: Orlando, Florida, United States
- Genres: Pop punk, synthpop
- Years active: 2009-present
- Members: Dylan James; Mike Battista; Nate Whittenburg; Jordan Wheeler
- Past members: Allen Niles; Mitchell Willard; Jake Smith; Tim Howell; Collin East; Tae Kim; Vinnie DeRise; Tyler Whiting; Guy Petrie; Evan Guffin; Juan Rodriguez; Cody Simmons; Joel VanWie; Julian Alexander; Logan Garcia; Thomas Filbert; Benjamin Jimenez; Jonathan Riley; Josh Grimes
- Website: http://www.thelastsleeplesscity.com

The Last Sleepless City is an American pop punk band from Orlando, Florida, formed in 2009 under the name Autumn Under Fire. The only permanent member is frontman Dylan James, who writes the music and plays all the instruments on the studio records, while the other members back him up for live shows or music videos.

The band is mainly known for their cover of "Let It Go" by Idina Menzel, which has been viewed, as of January 2016, over 865,000 times on the band's YouTube channel, and over 1,663,000 times on the music promoting YouTube channel Ghost Killer Entertainment, making it the most viewed video on both channels.

== History ==
=== Formation and early years as Autumn Under Fire (2009–2010) ===
The Last Sleepless City was formed in the summer of 2009 under the name Autumn Under Fire. Dylan James had just seen Breathe Carolina performing on the Vans Warped Tour and he wanted to start a band in their style. He recruited his friend Allen Niles to scream and play the synthesizer, while he would be the singer and guitarist. The band released their debut EP, called Time To Take Cover on November 6, 2009. After releasing the EP, Dylan decided to find a new guitarist for Autumn Under Fire, so that he wouldn't have to play the guitar while singing during live shows. After recruiting Mitchell Willard for guitar duties, the band released another EP, called Crash The Scene.

=== Name change and lineup instability (2010–2012) ===
Mitchell Willard left the band in late 2010. Following his loss, Dylan and Allen started looking for people to replace him, and found Jake Smith, Tim Howell, Collin East and Tae Kim. With this six-member lineup, the band changed its name to The Last Sleepless City. As Autumn Under Fire songs had a very electronic sound, The Last Sleepless City would include more pop-punk aspects to their music. The band started working on a CD shortly after their name change, and played a live show for its release.

On November 15, 2011, with a new five-member lineup, the band released an acoustic EP called Words To Say. In 2012, all the band members, except Dylan, left the band.

=== Ignite The Stars (2012–2014) ===
On December 1, 2012, with a new lineup consisting of Dylan with new members Guy Petrie, Evan Guffin, Juan Rodriguez and Cody Simmons, The Last Sleepless City released an EP called Ignite the Stars. The EP includes the song "Dreamers Never Die", which is the most popular song on the band's YouTube channel. Dylan says it is his "most meaningful song". Fans of the band are also dubbed "Dreamers".

Following the departure of guitarist Guy Petrie in early 2013, The Last Sleepless City played mainly acoustic shows. The band also released a cover of "Jamie All Over" by Mayday Parade and an acoustic version of "Dreamers Never Die".

=== Recent activity (2014-present) ===
In 2013, all the band members, except Dylan, left The Last Sleepless City again. On February 25, 2014, with new members Joel VanWie, Julian Alexander, Logan Garcia and Jonathan Riley, the band released a cover of "Let It Go" by Idina Menzel. Following the release of this cover, Dylan started uploading a large number of solo covers. The Last Sleepless City also did two other band covers, one of "Feeling This" by blink-182 and one of "She Looks So Perfect" by 5 Seconds of Summer.

On July 27, 2014, the band played at Warped Tour 2014. Due to guitarists Joel VanWie and Julian Alexander, and bassist Logan Garcia leaving the band shortly before Warped Tour, Benjamin Jimenez and Thomas Filbert filled in for this show.

Since playing Warped Tour, The Last Sleepless City functioned as a solo act, with Dylan playing all the instruments along with providing vocals. The former Last Sleepless City members Mike Battista, Benjamin Jimenez and Jonathan Riley rejoined the band in mid-2015, in addition to new member Josh Grimes and several appear on the band's music video for the song "Big Ideas, Bigger Hearts", released on June 9, 2015.

The Last Sleepless City is currently working on the band's upcoming album Constellations which is being produced by All Time Low drummer Rian Dawson.The first single Paperback was released on April 7, 2017.

== Musical style ==
The band define their musical style as pop-punk and synth-pop. They also make use of breakdowns in their songs, with occasional screamed vocals, for example their song "Dreamers Never Die" features a breakdown with Kyle Burrier, from melodic hardcore band Secret Keeper, screaming.

In their early days as Autumn Under Fire, the band played a much more electronic-oriented sound with frequent screaming from band member Allen Niles, a style that the band called "screamotronic".

== Band members ==
Current

- Dylan James - lead vocals, songwriting, guitars, bass, keyboards, programming (2009–present)
- Mike Battista - drums (2011-2012, 2016–present)
- Nate Whittenburg - lead guitar (2020–present)
- Jordan Wheeler - bass (2020–present)

Former

- Allen Niles - unclean vocals, keyboards, synthesizers (2009–2011)
- Mitchell Willard - lead guitar (2009–2010)
- Jake Smith - drums (2010–2011)
- Tim Howell - lead guitar (2010–2011)
- Collin East - bass, backing vocals (2010–2012)
- Tae Kim - lead guitar (2011–2012), rhythm guitar (2010–2011)
- Vinnie DeRise - lead guitar (2011, 2015-2016)
- Tyler Whiting - rhythm guitar, co-lead vocals (2011–2012)
- Guy Petrie - lead guitar (2012–2013)
- Evan Guffin - bass, rhythm guitar (2012–2014)
- Juan Rodriguez - lead guitar (2013–2014), rhythm guitar (2012–2013)
- Cody Simmons - drums, keyboards (2012–2014)
- Joel VanWie - lead guitar, backing vocals (2014)
- Julian Alexander - rhythm and lead guitar, backing vocals (2014)
- Logan Garcia - bass, backing vocals (2014)
- Thomas Filbert - rhythm guitar (2014)
- Jonathan Riley - lead guitar (2016), drums (2014, 2015-2016)
- Josh Grimes - lead guitar, bass, piano, backing vocals (2016–2019)
- Benjamin Jimenez - rhythm guitar (2015–2019), lead guitar (2014), backing vocals, unclean vocals (2014, 2015–2019)

== Discography ==
=== EPs ===
as Autumn Under Fire

- Time To Take Cover (2009)
- Crash The Scene (2010)

as The Last Sleepless City

- Words To Say (2011)
- Ignite The Stars (2012)
- Constellations (TBA)

=== Singles ===
- "Let It Go" (Idina Menzel cover) (2014)
- "Big Ideas, Bigger Hearts" (2015, re-recorded in 2017)
- "Love Yourself" (Justin Bieber cover) (2016)
- "Paperback" (2017)
- "Make Believe" (2018)
- "Into the Unknown" (Idina Menzel cover) (2020)
- "Good 4 U" (Olivia Rodrigo cover) (2021)
