= Van Wieren =

van Wieren is a surname. Notable people with the surname include:

- Glenn Van Wieren (born 1942), American college basketball coach
- Mona Van Wieren, pen name
- Larry van Wieren (born 1951), Dutch ice hockey player
- Pete Van Wieren (1944–2014), American sportscaster

== See also ==
- Van Dieren (surname)
