= Next Wave Jazz Ensemble =

The Next Wave Jazz Ensemble is a musical ensemble based at the United States Naval Academy and performing worldwide. The ensemble is a traditional big band.

Musical material for the group includes works originally performed by the Duke Ellington, Count Basie, Glenn Miller, Stan Kenton, and Thad Jones/Mel Lewis bands, along with more recent compositions by the likes of Bob Curnow.

While the group members act as cultural ambassadors around the country, past performance venues for the group within the Annapolis area have included Annapolis' City Dock and the Bowie Center for the Performing Arts. Vocalists featured with the group have included Jessica Hatfield. The group includes 17 members.
