= The Next Wave (book) =

- Original 1st edition cover
- Author: Darrell M. West
- Language: English
- Subject: Digital technology
- Publisher: Brookings Institution Press
- Publication date: 1567.10.16
- Publication place: United States
- Media type: Print (Paperback)

The Next Wave: Using Digital Technology to Further Social and Political Innovation is a 2011 book which is written by Darrell M. West, who is an author and political scientist, now Director of the Brookings Institution. This book is composed of 9 chapters and its topic is a social change with innovation in digital technology. The author shows how changes in nation, society and private life, which are derived from increase in efficiency, are going to be when technology is combined with many parts of government, policies and society, and how we maximize effects of those changes.

== Review ==
Ugur Gokay Ortasoz (University of Lille) reviewed this book for Political Studies Review, writing that "In this empirical work Darrell West informs the reader in a comprehensive manner about the policies and usage of information technology, and he shows how to handle difficulties while still innovating systems for use in both the public and private sectors."

The book was also reviewed for the Contemporary Sociology. The reviewer concluded that "This book will provide policymakers and business leaders with pragmatic evidence that digital technology can promote not only economic efficiency but also social and political innovation throughout society".

A review in Times Higher Education offers the following commentary about this book: "[West] champions technology as a key catalyst for change in many areas of society. [...] with the notable exception of education, where his commentary is thin, West is successful. He offers readers a panoramic view of the radical changes taking place in political and social life, healthcare, the military, commerce, publishing and the media. [...] This revolution, West's next wave, may or may not crash upon our shores, as is the case with all futurology; we must wait and see. Whatever the future holds, this book offers a fascinating window on our possible digital future."

== Analysis ==
The book is inspired by Toffler's The Third Wave.
