= NextWave Wireless =

- Company type: Private
- Founded: San Diego, California, United States
- Headquarters: San Diego, California, U.S.
- Parent: AT&T (2013-present)
- Website: nextwave.com

NextWave Wireless Inc. was a wireless technology company that produced mobile multimedia solutions and speculated in the wireless spectrum market. The company consisted principally of various wireless spectrum holdings.

The company is most notable for successfully suing the U.S. government for improperly seizing its assets while under bankruptcy protection.

AT&T announced its acquisition of NextWave in 2012.

== History ==
The company original spun out of QUALCOMM in 1995 and began life as the biggest bidder in the FCC C-Block. NextWave originally won the licenses in an auction intended for small businesses with limited resources in 1996. NextWave, which bid $4.7 billion for the licenses, made the minimum 10 percent down payment of $500 million for the spectrum.

But shortly thereafter NextWave filed for bankruptcy protection and defaulted on its payments for the licenses. The FCC, in turn, confiscated the licenses and re-sold them to Verizon Wireless and the subsidiaries of AT&T Wireless and Cingular Wireless, among others, for $17 billion in an auction that ended in January 2001.

Ultimately NextWave prevailed in the Supreme Court, 8-1, and was permitted to keep the PCS licenses. NextWave's bankruptcy protection lasted approximately ten years, during which time the asset value of the licenses had dramatically increased and NextWave was able to repay the original debt and sell their spectrum assets to Verizon Wireless, Cingular (now AT&T) and MetroPCS. They re-emerged as NextWave Wireless with $550M in capital.

The reborn company had several areas of focus: development of a 4G broadband network through its Network Solutions Group in Las Vegas, NV, development of WiMAX baseband and RF integrated circuits and related technology in its Advanced Technology Group in San Diego, CA, and accumulation of spectrum and other carrier assets both in the U.S. and internationally.

NextWave made several significant acquisitions that shaped its business and technology strategy. PacketVideo was acquired in 2005, as was a majority share in Cygnus Multimedia (a start up firm focusing on WiMax). In 2007 NextWave completed the acquisition of GoNetworks (a startup developing beamforming WiFi equipment) and IP Wireless (a UK firm that developed TD-CDMA equipment) for $100M. The IP Wireless business failed to produce expected revenue and in late 2008 it was sold back to its management team for $1M. Due to financial difficulties, NextWave was forced to shut down the GoNetworks subsidiary and the Network Solutions Group in 2008, followed by the 3-year-old Advanced Technology Group and the cessation of WiMax development in 2009.

Business Week reported on August 2, 2012 that AT&T agreed to acquire NextWave with its debt for a price of up to $600 million. AT&T wishes to use NextWave's spectrum to bolster its own.

The acquisition closed on January 24, 2013.
