= PacketVideo =

Wireless multimedia company

PacketVideo Corporation
- Type: Privately Held
- Founded: San Diego, California, U.S.
- Headquarters: San Diego, California, U.S.
- Key people: Mark Tapling, CEO and Team ;
- Website: https://web.archive.org/web/20171104023722/http://www.pv.com/

PacketVideo Corporation or PV was a San Diego–based company that produced software for wireless multimedia, including the display of video on mobile handsets. The PacketVideo name wasn't actively used after being acquired by Lynx Technology.

== History ==
PV was founded in San Diego, California, on 10 August 1998 by James C. Brailean, Cheuk Chan, Osama Al-shaykh, Gene Wen and Mark R Banham. In 2003 PacketVideo sold its infrastructure division to Alcatel. In 2005, PacketVideo was acquired in NextWave Wireless. In 2010, PacketVideo became a wholly owned subsidiary of NTT DoCoMo. Corporate parent NTT DOCOMO sold PacketVideo NorthAmerica and Europe to Lynx Technology on 10 May 2015 and the remaining portion, PacketVideo Japan, exactly one year later on 10 May 2016.

== Products ==
PV's customers include mobile operators such as Verizon Wireless, NTT DoCoMo and Orange, handset manufacturers, and consumer electronics companies. PV's software is embedded in more than 249 million devices worldwide and more than 248 different products.

Major product groups from PV are:

- CORE, which provides a universal structure for mobile multimedia applications. CORE is an established framework that can support any media services.
- MediaFusion, a white-label client-server software application to develop and launch on-device portals for rich media services.
- TwonkyMedia suite of products that connect home entertainment devices.

== Locations ==
PacketVideo has presence in three continents, with its headquarters in San Diego. Major development centers are in San Diego, Chicago, Chandigarh, Charlotte, Tokyo, Tampere, Berlin, Boston, and Basel. Sales and customer support centers are in San Diego, Chicago, Charlotte, Tokyo, Tampere, Nice, and Basel.

== Affiliations ==
PacketVideo is a member of industry forum and consortiums, including the Open Handset Alliance, 3rd Generation Partnership Project, Broadcast Mobile Convergence Forum, FLO Forum, International Multimedia Telecommunications Consortium, Mobile DTV Alliance, MPEG Industry Forum, Open Mobile Alliance, and the Digital Living Network Alliance
