= Electronic sell-through =

System of selling video over the Internet

Electronic sell-through (EST) is a method of media distribution whereby consumers pay a one-time fee to download a media file for storage on a hard drive. Although EST is often described as a transaction that grants content "ownership" to the consumer, the content may become unusable after a certain period and may not be viewable using competing platforms. EST is used by a wide array of digital media products, including movies, television, music, games, and mobile applications. The term is sometimes used interchangeably with download to own (DTO).

== Film and television ==
The film and television industry's $18.8 billion home entertainment market consists of rental and sell-through segments, the latter of which includes the electronic sell-through of digital content. In 2010, EST generated $683 million of total home entertainment revenues, putting it behind the more lucrative revenue streams of cable video-on-demand (VOD) and internet video-on-demand (iVOD), which brought in a combined $1.8 billion in the same period.

In 2010, Apple's iTunes Store accounted for three quarters of the U.S. EST business. The rest of the EST market was captured by Microsoft (via its Zune Video platform), Sony, Amazon VOD (now Amazon Video), and Walmart (via its VUDU service).

A number of industry trends indicate the future expansion of EST's share of digital distribution revenues. David Bishop, worldwide president of Sony Pictures Home Entertainment, describes the following outlook:

"With the launch of UltraViolet (the cloud-based digital copy locker system) establishing a common digital distribution platform later this year, prices potentially coming down on digital sales, more marketing devoted to digital sellthrough, and studios adding more value to the sellthrough product by making HD available and building in smarter extra features, we see the balance tilting even more toward owning and collecting digital movies."
