= David Van Wie =

American inventor and entrepreneur

David Van Wie (born 1964) is an American inventor, scientist and entrepreneur. Van Wie was educated at Pomona College and the University of Wisconsin.

Van Wie worked for Nimbus Information Systems, a subsidiary of Maxwell Communications, between 1989 and 1991, where he managed the development of a high-speed data retrieval system. In 1991 became president and CEO of CD-ROM Solutions, a position he held until 1992, when he became a co-founder of InterTrust Technologies. There, in addition to work on patent development, he first served as the Chief Technology Officer, before taking on the position of senior vice president, research and chairman. He took the company public in 1999, just before the 2000 Stock Market Crash.

In 2007, Van Wie co-founded Sococo (Social Communications Company), where he developed several new communications technologies from lab to market and became chairman in August 2011. He serves as both chairman and CEO. Among other things, the company produced virtual office spaces for online employees to interact, through something called Team Space. He later founded Aventurine in 2013, a venture capital company specializing in intellectual property. Over his career he has received 45 patents on DRM technologies, and has stated he has his name on more than 250 patent applications.
