= Digital locker =

Online file or digital media storage service

A digital locker or cyberlocker is an online file or digital media storage service. Files stored include music, videos, movies, games and other media. The term was used by Microsoft as a part of its Windows Marketplace in 2004. By storing files in a digital locker, users are able to access them anywhere they can find internet connections. Most (but not all) digital locker services require a user to register. Prices range from free to paid, divided according to the complications and strength of the lock.

== Uses ==
Digital lockers, as opposed to simple file storage services, are typically associated with digital distribution — a commercial store where you can buy content such as Steam, Google Play, Amazon, and iTunes.

Download / Play / Watch

Digital locker services often come with integrated client software that allows users to play the movies or games or songs.

Upload

Many digital locker services enable users to upload their own content or provide synchronization software that will scan a user's computer and upload the appropriate media for them.

Matching

Some services like Google Play and iTunes will match songs users have to a digital signature, allowing them to skip the sometimes slow process of uploading the media file. Rather, once the song is matched, it will just be added to a user's library.

== Digital rights management ==
Digital lockers are often used as a way of controlling access to media via digital rights management (DRM). Services such as Steam, Origin, Blizzard, Vudu, and others offer to users the convenience of a digital locker in exchange for the control of DRM.

== Copyright infringement ==
Some digital locker services such as Hotfile and MegaUpload have been accused of being large contributors towards copyright infringement. The MPAA alleged that Hotfile and similar services promote copyright infringement by paying users referral fees, and thus encouraging them to upload popular copyrighted content.

== See also ==
- File hosting service
- Cloud storage
- Comparison of file hosting services
- Comparison of file synchronization software
- Comparison of online backup services
- Comparison of online music lockers
- File sharing
- Digital distribution
