= VP9 =

2013 open and royalty-free video coding format

- Internet media type: video/VP9
- Developed by: Google
- Initial release: June 17, 2013
- Type of format: Video coding format
- Contained by: Matroska; WebM; IVF
- Extended from: VP8
- Extended to: AV1
- Standard: VP9 Bitstream & Decoding Process Specification
- Open format?: Yes
- Free format?: See § Patent claims
- Website: webmproject.org/vp9

VP9 is an open and royalty-free video coding format developed by Google.

VP9 is the successor to VP8 and competes mainly with MPEG's High Efficiency Video Coding (HEVC/H.265). At first, VP9 was mainly used on Google's video platform YouTube. The emergence of the Alliance for Open Media, and its support for the ongoing development of the successor to VP9, AV1, of which Google is a part, led to growing interest in the format.

In contrast to HEVC, VP9 support is common among modern web browsers (see HTML video § Browser support). Android has supported VP9 since version 4.4 KitKat, while Safari 14 added support for VP9 in iOS / iPadOS / tvOS 14 and macOS Big Sur.

Parts of the format are covered by patents held by Google. The company grants free usage of its own related patents based on reciprocity, i.e. as long as the user does not engage in patent litigations.

== History ==
VP9 is the last official iteration of the TrueMotion series of video formats that Google bought in 2010 for $134 million together with the company On2 Technologies that created it. The development of VP9 started in the second half of 2011 under the development names of Next Gen Open Video (NGOV) and VP-Next. The design goals for VP9 included reducing the bit rate by 50% compared to VP8 while maintaining the same video quality, and aiming for better compression efficiency than the MPEG High Efficiency Video Coding (HEVC) standard. In June 2013 the "profile 0" of VP9 was finalized, and two months later Google's Chrome browser was released with support for VP9 video playback. In October of that year a native VP9 decoder was added to FFmpeg, and to Libav six weeks later. Mozilla added VP9 support to Firefox in March 2014. In 2014 Google added two high bit depth profiles: profile 2 and profile 3.

In 2013 an updated version of the WebM format was published, featuring support for VP9 together with Opus audio.

In March 2013, the MPEG Licensing Administration dropped an announced assertion of disputed patent claims against VP8 and its successors after the United States Department of Justice started to investigate whether it was acting to unfairly stifle competition.

Throughout, Google has worked with hardware vendors to get VP9 support into silicon. In January 2014, Ittiam, in collaboration with ARM and Google, demonstrated its VP9 decoder for ARM Cortex devices. Using GPGPU techniques, the decoder was capable of 1080p at 30fps on an Arndale Board. In early 2015 Nvidia announced VP9 support in its Tegra X1 SoC, and VeriSilicon announced VP9 Profile 2 support in its Hantro G2v2 decoder IP.

In April 2015 Google released a significant update to its libvpx library, with version 1.4.0 adding support for 10-bit and 12-bit bit depth, 4:2:2 and 4:4:4 chroma subsampling, and VP9 multithreaded decoding/encoding.

In December 2015, Netflix published a draft proposal for including VP9 video in an MP4 container with MPEG Common Encryption.

In January 2016, Ittiam demonstrated an OpenCL based VP9 encoder. The encoder is targeting ARM Mali mobile GPUs and was demonstrated on a Samsung Galaxy S6.

VP9 support was added to Microsoft's web browser Edge in 2016.

In March 2017, Ittiam announced the completion of a project to enhance the encoding speed of libvpx. The speed improvement was said to be 50-70%, and the code "publicly available as part of libvpx".

== Features ==
VP9 is customized for video resolutions greater than 1080p (such as UHD) and also enables lossless compression. It supports theoretical resolutions up to 65536×65536, however the highest "Level 6.2" has a practical maximum resolution of 8192×4352 @120. For comparison, HEVC has a slightly lower practical maximum resolution of 8192×4320 @120 at its highest "Level 6.2" .

The VP9 format supports the following color spaces (and corresponding YCbCr to RGB transformation matrices): Rec. 601, Rec. 709, Rec. 2020, SMPTE-170, SMPTE-240, and sRGB.

VP9 supports many transfer functions and supports HDR video with hybrid log–gamma (HLG) or perceptual quantizer (PQ).

=== Efficiency ===
An early comparison that took varying encoding speed into account showed that x265 narrowly beat libvpx at the very highest quality (slowest encoding) whereas libvpx was superior at any other encoding speed, by SSIM.

Comparison of encoding artifacts

In a subjective quality comparison conducted in 2014 featuring the reference encoders for HEVC (HM 15.0), MPEG-4 AVC/H.264 (JM 18.6), and VP9 (libvpx 1.2.0 with preliminary VP9 support), VP9, like H.264, required about two times the bitrate to reach video quality comparable to HEVC, while with synthetic imagery VP9 was close to HEVC. By contrast, another subjective comparison from 2014 concluded that at higher quality settings HEVC and VP9 were tied at a 40 to 45% bitrate advantage over H.264.

Netflix, after a large test in August 2016, concluded that libvpx was 20% less efficient than x265, but by October the same year also found that tweaking encoding parameters could "reduce or even reverse the gap between VP9 and HEVC". At NAB 2017, Netflix shared that they had switched to the EVE encoder, which according to their studies offered better two-pass rate control and was 8% more efficient than libvpx.

An offline encoder comparison between libvpx, two HEVC encoders and x264 in May 2017 by Jan Ozer of Streaming Media Magazine, with encoding parameters supplied or reviewed by each encoder vendor (Google, MulticoreWare and MainConcept respectively), and using Netflix's VMAF objective metric, concluded that "VP9 and both HEVC codecs produce very similar performance" and "Particularly at lower bitrates, both HEVC codecs and VP9 deliver substantially better performance than H.264".

=== Performance ===
An encoding speed versus efficiency comparison of the reference implementation in libvpx, x264 and x265 was made by an FFmpeg developer in September 2015: By SSIM index, libvpx was mostly superior to x264 across the range of comparable encoding speeds, but the main benefit was at the slower end of x264@veryslow (reaching a sweet spot of 30–40% bitrate improvement within twice as slow as this), whereas x265 only became competitive with libvpx around 10 times as slow as x264@veryslow. It was concluded that libvpx and x265 were both capable of the claimed 50% bitrate improvement over H.264, but only at 10–20 times the encoding time of x264. Judged by the objective quality metric VQM in early 2015, the VP9 reference encoder delivered video quality on par with the best HEVC implementations.

A decoder comparison by the same developer showed 10% faster decoding for ffvp9 than ffh264 for same-quality video, or "identical" at same bitrate. It also showed that the implementation can make a difference, concluding that "ffvp9 beats libvpx consistently by 25–50%".

Another decoder comparison indicated 10–40 percent higher CPU load than H.264 (but does not say whether this was with ffvp9 or libvpx), and that on mobile, the Ittiam demo player was about 40 percent faster than the Chrome browser at playing VP9.

=== Profiles ===
There are several variants of the VP9 format (known as "coding profiles"), which successively allow more features; profile 0 is the basic variant, requiring the least from a hardware implementation:

profile 0
color depth: 8 bit/sample, chroma subsampling: 4:2:0
profile 1
color depth: 8 bit, chroma subsampling: 4:2:2, 4:2:0, 4:4:4
profile 2
color depth: 10–12 bit, chroma subsampling: 4:2:0
profile 3
color depth: 10–12 bit, chroma subsampling: 4:2:2, 4:2:0, 4:4:4

=== Levels ===
VP9 offers the following 14 levels:

Level	Luma Samples/s	Luma Picture Size	Max Bitrate (Mbit/s)	Max CPB Size for Visual Layer (MBits)	Min Compression Ratio	Max Tiles	Min Alt-Ref Distance	Max Reference Frames	Examples for resolution @ frame rate
1	829440	36864	0.20	0.40	2	1	4	8	256×144@15
1.1	2764800	73728	0.80	1.0	2	1	4	8	384×192@30
2	4608000	122880	1.8	1.5	2	1	4	8	480×256@30
2.1	9216000	245760	3.6	2.8	2	2	4	8	640×384@30
3	20736000	552960	7.2	6.0	2	4	4	8	1080×512@30
3.1	36864000	983040	12	10	2	4	4	8	1280×768@30
4	83558400	2228224	18	16	4	4	4	8	2048×1088@30
4.1	160432128	2228224	30	18	4	4	5	6	2048×1088@60
5	311951360	8912896	60	36	6	8	6	4	4096×2176@30
5.1	588251136	8912896	120	46	8	8	10	4	4096×2176@60
5.2	1176502272	8912896	180	TBD	8	8	10	4	4096×2176@120
6	1176502272	35651584	180	TBD	8	16	10	4	8192×4352@30
6.1	2353004544	35651584	240	TBD	8	16	10	4	8192×4352@60
6.2	4706009088	35651584	480	TBD	8	16	10	4	8192×4352@120

== Technology ==
Example partitioning and internal coding order of a coding unit

Transform coefficients are scanned in a round pattern (increasing distance from the corner). This is to coincide (better than the traditional zig-zag pattern) with the expected order of importance of the coefficients, so to increase their compressibility by entropy coding. A skewed variant of the pattern is used when the horizontal or vertical edge is more important.

VP9 is a traditional block-based transform coding format. The bitstream format is relatively simple compared to formats that offer similar bitrate efficiency like HEVC.

VP9 has many design improvements compared to VP8. Its biggest improvement is support for the use of coding units of 64×64 pixels. This is especially useful with high-resolution video. Also, the prediction of motion vectors was improved. In addition to VP8's four modes (average/"DC", "true motion", horizontal, vertical), VP9 supports six oblique directions for linear extrapolation of pixels in intra-frame prediction.

New coding tools also include:

- eighth-pixel precision for motion vectors,
- three different switchable 8-tap subpixel interpolation filters,
- improved selection of reference motion vectors,
- improved coding of offsets of motion vectors to their reference,
- improved entropy coding,
- improved and adapted (to new block sizes) loop filtering,
- the asymmetric discrete sine transform (ADST),
- larger discrete cosine transforms (DCT, 16×16 and 32×32), and
- improved segmentation of frames into areas with specific similarities (e.g. fore-/background)

In order to enable some parallel processing of frames, video frames can be split along coding unit boundaries into up to four rows of 256 to 4096 pixels wide evenly spaced tiles with each tile column coded independently. This is mandatory for video resolutions in excess of 4096 pixels. A tile header contains the tile size in bytes so decoders can skip ahead and decode each tile row in a separate thread. The image is then divided into coding units called superblocks of 64×64 pixels which are adaptively subpartitioned in a quadtree coding structure. They can be subdivided either horizontally or vertically or both; square (sub)units can be subdivided recursively down to 4×4 pixel blocks. Subunits are coded in raster scan order: left to right, top to bottom.

Starting from each key frame, decoders keep 8 frames buffered to be used as reference frames or to be shown later. Transmitted frames signal which buffer to overwrite and can optionally be decoded into one of the buffers without being shown. The encoder can send a minimal frame that just triggers one of the buffers to be displayed ("skip frame"). Each inter frame can reference up to three of the buffered frames for temporal prediction. Up to two of those reference frames can be used in each coding block to calculate a sample data prediction, using spatially displaced (motion compensation) content from a reference frame or an average of content from two reference frames ("compound prediction mode"). The (ideally small) remaining difference (delta encoding) from the computed prediction to the actual image content is transformed using a DCT or ADST (for edge blocks) and quantized.

Something like a b-frame can be coded while preserving the original frame order in the bitstream using a structure named superframes. Hidden alternate reference frames can be packed together with an ordinary inter frame and a skip frame that triggers display of previous hidden altref content from its reference frame buffer right after the accompanying p-frame.

VP9 enables lossless encoding by transmitting at the lowest quantization level (q index 0) an additional 4×4-block encoded Walsh–Hadamard transformed (WHT) residue signal.

In order to be seekable, raw VP9 bitstreams have to be encapsulated in a container format, for example Matroska (.mkv), its derived WebM format (.webm), or the Duck IVF format, which is traditionally supported by libvpx, a library that originated at The Duck Corporation. VP9 is identified as V_VP9 in WebM and VP09 in MP4, adhering to respective naming conventions.

== Adoption ==
Adobe Flash, which traditionally used VPx formats up to VP7, was never upgraded to VP8 or VP9, but instead to H.264. Therefore, VP9 penetrated web applications only with the shift from Flash to HTML5 technology, which was still somewhat immature when VP9 was introduced.

=== Content providers ===
A YouTube video statistics with VP9 video codec and Opus audio codec

A main user of VP9 is Google's popular video platform YouTube, which offers VP9 video at all resolutions along with Opus audio in the WebM file format, through DASH streaming.

Another early adopter was Wikipedia (specifically Wikimedia Commons, which hosts multimedia files across Wikipedia's subpages and languages). Wikipedia endorses open and royalty-free multimedia formats. As of 2016, the three accepted video formats are VP9, VP8 and Theora.

Since December 2016, Netflix has used VP9 encoding for their catalog, alongside H.264 and HEVC. As of February 2020, AV1 has been started to be adopted for mobile devices, not unlike how VP9 has started on the platform.

Google TV uses (at least in part) VP9 profile 2 with Widevine DRM.

Stadia used VP9 for video game streaming up to 4k on supported hardware like the Chromecast Ultra, mobile phones as well as web browsers.

Disney+ in August 2026 replaced its usage of HEVC in Europe with VP9, due to patent dispute with InterDigital on HEVC.

=== Encoding services ===
A series of cloud encoding services offer VP9 encoding, including Amazon, Bitmovin, Brightcove, castLabs, JW Player, Telestream, and Wowza.

Encoding.com has offered VP9 encoding since Q4 2016, which amounted to a yearly average of 11% popularity for VP9 among its customers that year.

=== Web middleware ===
JW Player supports VP9 in its widely used software-as-a-service HTML video player.

=== Browser support ===
VP9 is implemented in these web browsers:

- Chromium and Google Chrome (usable by default since version 29 from May and August 2013, respectively)
- Opera (since version 15 from July 2013)
- Firefox (since version 28 from March 2014)
- Microsoft Edge (as of summer 2016)
- Safari (as of Safari Technology Preview Release 110, with official support added in version 14)
- Pale Moon (as of 2018)

=== Operating system support ===
VP9 support by different operating systems
	Microsoft Windows	macOS	BSD / Linux	Android OS	iOS
Codec support	Yes; Partial: Win 10 v1607 Full: Win 10 v1809	Yes	Yes	Yes	Yes
Container support	On Windows 10 Anniversary Update (1607): WebM (.webm is not recognized; requires pseudo extension); Matroska (.mkv); On Windows 10 October 2018 Update (1809): WebM (.webm is recognized officially)	WebM (.webm): Introduced in macOS 11.3	WebM (.webm); Matroska (.mkv)	WebM (.webm); Matroska (.mkv)	WebM (.webm): Introduced in iOS 17.4
Notes	On Windows 10: On Anniversary Update (1607), limited support is available in Microsoft Edge (via MSE only) and Universal Windows Platform apps.; On April 2018 Update (1803) with Web Media Extensions preinstalled, Microsoft Edge (EdgeHTML 17) supports VP9 videos embedded in <video> tags.; On October 2018 Update (1809), VP9 Video Extensions is preinstalled. It enables encoding of VP8 and VP9 content on devices that do not have a hardware-based video encoder.	Support introduced in macOS 11.0	Support introduced by FFmpeg 2.7.7 "Nash"	Support introduced in Android 4.4	Support introduced in iOS 14.0

=== Media player software support ===
VP9 is supported in all major open source media player software, including VLC, MPlayer/MPlayer2/MPV, Kodi, MythTV, and FFplay.

=== Hardware device support ===
Android has had VP9 software decoding since version 4.4 "KitKat". For a list of consumer electronics with hardware support, including TVs, smartphones, set top boxes and game consoles, see webmproject.org's list.

=== Hardware implementations ===
Hardware accelerated VP9 decoding support is included in most GPUs and SoCs released after 2016. Intel first included VP9 hardware encoding with their Kaby Lake processors, introduced in August 2016.

=== Video game consoles ===
The Sony PlayStation 5 supports capturing 1080p and 2160p footage using VP9 in a WebM container.

=== Software implementations ===
The reference implementation from Google is found in the free software programming library libvpx. It has a single-pass and a two-pass encoding mode, but the single-pass mode is considered broken and does not offer effective control over the target bitrate.

==== Encoding ====
- libvpx
- SVT-VP9 – Scalable Video Technology for VP9 – open-source encoder by Intel
- Eve – a commercial encoder

==== Decoding ====
- libvpx
- ffvp9 (FFmpeg)

FFmpeg's VP9 decoder takes advantage of a corpus of SIMD optimizations shared with other codecs to make it fast. A comparison made by an FFmpeg developer indicated that this was faster than libvpx, and compared to FFmpeg's h.264 decoder, "identical" performance for same-bitrate video, or about 10% faster for same-quality video.

== Patent claims ==
In March 2019, Luxembourg-based Sisvel announced the formation of patent pools for VP9 and AV1. Members of the pools included JVCKenwood, NTT, Orange S.A., Philips, and Toshiba, all of whom were also licensing patents to the MPEG-LA for either the AVC, DASH, or the HEVC patent pools. A list of claimed patents was first published on 10 March 2020. This list contains over 650 patents.

Sisvel's prices are .24 Euros for display devices and .08 Euros for non-display devices using VP9, but would not seek royalties for encoded content. However, their license makes no exemption for software.

According to The WebM Project, Google does not plan to alter their current or upcoming usage plans of VP9 or AV1 even though they are aware of the patent pools, none of the licensors of the patent pools were involved in the development of VP9 or VP8, and third parties cannot be stopped from demanding licensing fees from any technology that is open-source, royalty-free, and/or free-of-charge.

== Successor: from VP10 to AV1 ==
On September 12, 2014, Google announced that development on VP10 had begun and that after the release of VP10 they planned to have an 18-month gap between releases of video formats. In August 2015, Google began to publish code for VP10.

However, Google decided to incorporate VP10 into AOMedia Video 1 (AV1). The AV1 codec was developed based on a combination of technologies from VP10, Daala (Xiph/Mozilla) and Thor (Cisco). Accordingly, Google has stated that they will not deploy VP10 internally nor officially release it, making VP9 the last of the VPx-based codecs to be released by Google.

== See also ==
- AV1
- HEVC
