= ITVX =

British online video-on-demand service

- Logo used since 2022

- ITVX homepage as of December 2022
- Website type: OTT streaming platform
- Available in: English
- Predecessor: CITV ITV Hub
- Area served: United Kingdom (Note: Content differs in Scotland and Northern Ireland, due to ITV1 not being available in Scotland and UTV having original programming not seen in the rest of the United Kingdom)
- Parent: ITV Consumer Limited (ITV plc)
- Website: www.itv.com
- Users: 1.3 million (As of December 2023).
- Launched: 8 December 2022; 3 years ago

ITVX is a British over-the-top, ad-supported streaming service operated by ITV plc. The service offers original content from the broadcaster, livestreams of the ITV television channels, FAST channels, and exclusive and licensed programming.

The service succeeds the ITV Hub, which originally launched on 5 December 2008 and had at least 30 million registered users by July 2019.

== History ==
In March 2022, ITV announced the launch of ITVX, an integrated advertising and subscription-funded platform. The service serves as a replacement for ITV Hub, taking over as the broadcaster's catch-up service, and is positioned as a direct competitor to BBC iPlayer and the Channel 4 VOD service, featuring more exclusive programming and a selection of FAST channels.

During the same month, it was announced that ITV bought out the BBC's share in the UK version of BritBox, and would also include access to the service for ITVX Premium subscribers. The BBC will continue to operate the international BritBox service while remaining a content provider for ITVX.

The service was rolled out on 17 November 2022 before it officially launched on 8 December.

On 28 February 2023, it was confirmed that ITVX Premium users would have access to StudioCanal Presents, which launched in the spring of that year. On 10 March 2023, it was confirmed that ITVX would become the new home of CITV content, with the launch of a dedicated hub called "ITVX Kids" from 22 July 2023.

On 30 May 2024, AMC Reality shows were added to the service.

By April 2024, BritBox UK ceased to exist as a standalone platform and was fully absorbed into ITVX's premium tier.

In July 2024, ITV announced a partnership with NBCUniversal to expand its streaming service, Hayu, into ITVX.

On 5 April 2025, content licensed from StudioCanal was removed from the service after the deal between the company and ITV ended.

On 10 July 2025, Disney and ITV announced they would share shows and films, marketed as a ‘Taste of ITVX’ and a ‘Taste of Disney+’. ITV shows appearing on Disney+ included Endeavour and The 1% Club whilst Disney content appearing on ITVX included Andor and Lilo & Stitch: The Series.

On 7 November 2025, ITV confirmed it was in talks to sell its media and entertainment division (which includes the TV channels and ITVX) to Comcast subsidiary Sky for £1.6 billion. ITV Studios would not be included.

== List of FAST channels ==
=== Current FAST channels ===
ITVX's current free ad-supported streaming television (FAST) channels are listed on its Web site. Channels include:

Name	About
Carry On and On	Films from the franchise.
The Chase	Episodes from the UK version of the show.
Comedy 24/7	Various comedy programmes.
ITV Classics	Various classic shows mostly sourced from ITV-owned catalogues.
ITVX Kids	Children's shows from ITVX's catalogue.
ITV Signed	Programmes with in-vision signing.
Midsomer Murders	Episodes from the series.
The Only Way is Essex TV	Episodes from the series.
Saturday Night, Every Night	Entertainment, reality and game-show programmes.
Space Live (powered by Sen)	Live 4K footage of Earth.
Vera	Episodes from the series.

=== Seasonal ===
Name	About
Big Brother: Live Stream	Daily live stream of the Big Brother house from 11pm to 2am on Sunday-Friday, and from 9pm to 2am on Saturday.
Black Voices	Various Black-themed programmes. Aired during Black History Month.
Halloween 24/7	Various Halloween-themed programmes and films. Aired during October.
ITV Sport	Live coverage of various sporting events.
Love Island	Episodes from different versions of the show.
Oscars 24/7	Various Oscar-winning and nominated films. Aired during and after the Oscars ceremonies.
Xmas Movies	Christmas movies from Hallmark Channel.

=== Former FAST channels ===
Name	About
Award Winning Movies	Indie/modern movies mostly sourced from independent distributors.
Back to the 90s	1990s programmes.
Blast from the Past	Various classic shows mostly sourced from ITV-owned catalogues.
Classic Comedy	Comedy shows mostly sourced from Fremantle's Thames catalogue.
Classic Movies	Films mostly sourced from the ITV-owned ITC and Rank catalogues.
Crime Drama	Various ITV crime dramas.
Hell's Kitchen	Episodes from the US version of the series.
LEGO® Universe	Various LEGO-themed kids' shows.
Love Island International	Episodes from other English-language versions of the franchise.
Loved Up	Dating/love-focused reality shows and dramas.
Massive Laughs	Comedy programmes such as panel shows.
Movies 24/7	A mixture of ITV-owned and independent movies.
Out of this World	Sci-fi/supernatural programmes mostly sourced from the ITV-owned ITC catalogue.
Period Dramas	Various period dramas.
Pride	Programmes featuring LGBTQ+ themes.
Quiz Time	Various game shows.
Reality 24/7	Various reality shows.
Rugby World Cup Classics	Highlights of classic Rugby World Cup matches.
Sail GP	Sail GP races.
The Real Housewives UK	Episodes of The Real Housewives of Cheshire and Jersey.
True Crime International	Crime documentaries.
Ultimate Ant & Dec	Programmes hosted by Ant & Dec.
Unwind with ITV	Unwind footage on a loop.
World Cup Classics	World Cup Football matches.
World of Morse	Episodes from the Inspector Morse franchise.

== Original series ==
Series	First aired	Last aired	Genre
Changing Ends	1 June 2023	present	Comedy
Platform 7	7 December 2023		Thriller
Red Eye	21 April 2024	present	Thriller

== Platforms and apps ==
As of August 2024, ITVX is available on Apple's App store, and Google's Play Store Amazon Fire tablets and TVs, select Android TV models, Android devices running 7.0 and above, Apple TV, Chromecast, Freesat, Freeview Play, IOS, LG webOS Smart TVs, PlayStation 4 & 5, Roku, Samsung Smart TVs models from 2016 and above. Sky (Glass, Sky Q, and Sky Stream puck), Virgin Media (360, Stream, TiVo), YouView, and Xbox One and Series X/S.

== ITV Hub ==
ITV Hub
- Screenshot ITV Hub homepage, November 2022
- Developer: ITV Consumer Limited (ITV plc)
- Release: 5 December 2008
- Operating system: Windows, macOS, Linux
- Platform: Online, cable, IPTV, mobile
- Successor: ITVX
- Available in: English
- Type: Video on demand
- Website: www.itv.com

The ITV Player, later known as the ITV Hub, was launched in 2008.

ITV Player logo used until 22 November 2015

The ITV Player was originally a website, and was then extended to television and other platforms. Initially, the website used Microsoft Silverlight rather than Adobe Flash as used by BBC iPlayer and Channel 4's 4oD, and Windows Media Video, but changed to Flash on 15 September 2009.

In November 2009, ITV Player was revamped, improving navigation and making the site more visually appealing. The service was free to use, funded by pre-, mid-, and post-roll advertisements. Users had been able to use ad-blocking software, but in mid-2010 the ITV website was upgraded to detect ad-blocking software. Video is sent at multiple bit rates and uses adaptive technology in the player to best determine the rate based on the user's connection. ITV Hub used HTML5 Media Source Extensions with Encrypted Media Extensions to deliver video.

In summer 2011, ITV Player incorporated subtitles and CITV programming. The redesigned website was launched on 22 August 2011 with upgraded search features, and a new more reliable Flash-based video player.

On 29 October 2012 the site started offering paid-for content in addition to the existing free 30-day catch-up.

Content only broadcast on the main ITV channel (rather than also on ITV2, ITV3, ITV4, or CITV) was only available to viewers located in ITV plc regions: England, Wales, southern Scotland, the Channel Islands, the Isle of Man, and on UTV in Northern Ireland. If the same programme had also been broadcast in central and northern Scotland, users located in those areas may be able to view it on the STV Player, using the location provided by the user's ISP. On 6 June 2016, ITV Hub replaced the UTV Player service in Northern Ireland, following the latter's sale to ITV plc in February 2016.

Domino's Pizza became the platform's first sponsor, on 6 March 2018.

== See also ==
- BBC iPlayer
- Channel 4 (VoD service)
- 5
- U
- List of streaming media services
