= ARM Cortex-A15 =

Family of microprocessor cores with ARM microarchitecture

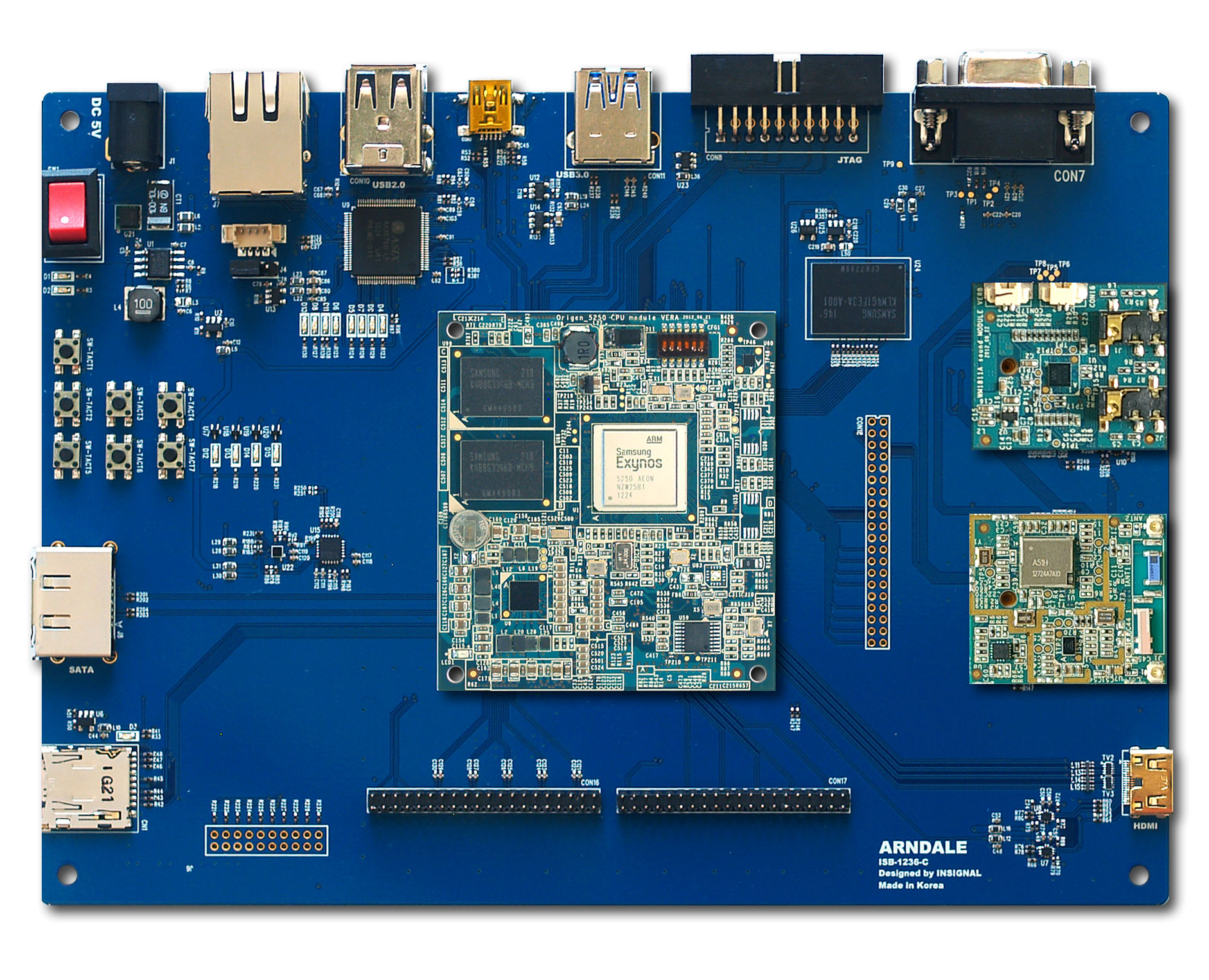

General information
- Launched: In production late 2011, to market late 2012
- Designed by: ARM Holdings

Performance
- Max. CPU clock rate: 1.0 GHz to 2.5 GHz

Physical specifications
- Cores: 1–4 per cluster, 1–2 clusters per physical chip

Cache
- L1 cache: 64 KB (32 KB I-cache, 32 KB D-cache) per core
- L2 cache: Up to 4 MB per cluster
- L3 cache: none

Architecture and classification
- Technology node: 32 nm/28 nm initially to 22 nm roadmap
- Instruction set: ARMv7-A

The ARM Cortex-A15 MPCore is a 32-bit processor core licensed by ARM Holdings implementing the ARMv7-A architecture. It is a multicore processor with out-of-order superscalar pipeline running at up to 2.5 GHz.

== Overview ==
ARM has claimed that the Cortex-A15 core is 40 percent more powerful than the Cortex-A9 core with the same number of cores at the same speed. The first A15 designs came out in the autumn of 2011, but products based on the chip did not reach the market until 2012.

Key features of the Cortex-A15 core are:

- 40-bit Large Physical Address Extensions (LPAE) addressing up to 1 TB of RAM with a 32-bit virtual address space.
- 15 stage integer/17–25 stage floating point pipeline, with out-of-order speculative issue 3-way superscalar execution pipeline
- 4 cores per cluster, up to 2 clusters per chip with CoreLink 400 (CCI-400, an AMBA-4 coherent interconnect) and 4 clusters per chip with CCN-504. ARM provides specifications but the licensees individually design ARM chips, and AMBA-4 scales beyond 2 clusters. The theoretical limit is 16 clusters; 4 bits are used to code the CLUSTERID number in the CP15 register (bits 8 to 11).
- DSP and NEON SIMD extensions onboard (per core)
- VFPv4 Floating Point Unit onboard (per core)
- Hardware virtualization support
- Thumb-2 instruction set encoding to reduce the size of programs with little impact on performance
- TrustZone security extensions
- Jazelle RCT for JIT compilation
- Program Trace Macrocell and CoreSight Design Kit for unobtrusive tracing of instruction execution
- 32 KB data + 32 KB instruction L1 cache per core
- Integrated low-latency level-2 cache controller, up to 4 MB per cluster

== Chips ==
First implementation came from Samsung in 2012 with the Exynos 5 Dual, which shipped in October 2012 with the Samsung Chromebook Series 3 (ARM version), followed in November by the Google Nexus 10.

Press announcements of current implementations:

- Broadcom SoC
- HiSilicon K3V3
- Nvidia Tegra 4 (Wayne) and Tegra K1.
- Samsung Exynos 5 Dual, Quad and Octa
- ST-Ericsson Nova A9600 (cancelled) (dual-core @ 2.5 GHz over 20k DMIPS)
- Texas Instruments OMAP 5 SoCs and Sitara AM57x family

Other licensees, such as LG, are expected to produce an A15 based design at some point.

=== Systems on a chip ===
Model Number	Semiconductor technology	CPU	GPU	Memory interface	Wireless radio technologies	Availability	Utilizing devices
HiSilicon K3V3	28 nm HPL	big.LITTLE architecture using 1.8 GHz dual-core ARM Cortex-A15 + dual-core ARM Cortex-A7	Mali-T628			H2 2014	
Nvidia Tegra 4 T40	28 nm HPL	1.9 GHz quad-core ARM Cortex-A15 + 1 low power core	Nvidia GeForce @ 72 core, 672 MHz, 96.8 GFLOPS = 48 PS + 24 VU × 0.672 × 2 (96.8 GFLOPS)(support DirectX 11+, OpenGL 4.X, and PhysX)	32-bit dual-channel DDR3L or LPDDR3 up to 933 MHz (1866 MT/s data rate)	Category 3 (100 Mbit/s) LTE	Q2 2013	Nvidia Shield Tegra Note 7
Nvidia Tegra 4 AP40	28 nm HPL	1.2-1.8 GHz quad-core + low power core	Nvidia GPU 60 cores (support DirectX 11+, OpenGL 4.X, and PhysX)	32-bit dual-channel 800 MHz LPDDR3	Category 3 (100 Mbit/s) LTE	Q3 2013	
Nvidia Tegra K1	28 nm HPm	2.3 GHz quad-core + battery saver core	Kepler SMX (192 CUDA cores, 8 TMUs, 4 ROPs)	32-bit dual-channel DDR3L, LPDDR3 or LPDDR2		Q2 2014	Jetson TK1 development board, Lenovo ThinkVision 28, Xiaomi MiPad, Shield Tablet
Texas Instruments OMAP5430	28 nm	1.7 GHz dual-core	PowerVR SGX544MP2 @ 532 MHz + dedicated 2D graphics accelerator	32-bit dual-channel 532 MHz LPDDR2		Q2 2013	phyCore-OMAP5430
Texas Instruments OMAP5432	28 nm	1.5 GHz dual-core	PowerVR SGX544MP2 @ 532 MHz + dedicated 2D graphics accelerator	32-bit dual-channel 532 MHz DDR3		Q2 2013	DragonBox Pyra, SVTronics EVM, Compulab SBC-T54
Texas Instruments AM57x	28 nm	1.5 GHz single or dual-core	PowerVR SGX544MP2 @ 532 MHz + dedicated 2D graphics accelerator	32-bit dual-channel 532 MHz DDR3		Q4 2015	BeagleBoard-X15, BeagleBone AI, Elesar Titanium
Texas Instruments 66AK2x	28 nm	1.5 GHz single, dual, and quad core devices	1-8 C66x DSP cores, radio acceleration, and many other application specific accelerators			Q4 2015	
Exynos 5 Dual (previously Exynos 5250)	32 nm HKMG	1.7 GHz dual-core ARM Cortex-A15	ARM Mali-T604 (quad-core) @ 533 MHz; 68.224 GFLOPS	32-bit dual-channel 800 MHz LPDDR3/DDR3 (12.8 GB/sec) or 533 MHz LPDDR2 (8.5 GB/sec)		Q3 2012	Samsung Chromebook XE303C12, Google Nexus 10, Arndale Board, Huins ACHRO 5250 Exynos, Freelander PD800 HD, Voyo A15, HP Chromebook 11, Samsung Homesync
Exynos 5 Octa (internally Exynos 5410)	28 nm HKMG	1.6 GHz quad-core ARM Cortex-A15 and 1.2 GHz quad-core ARM Cortex-A7 (ARM big.LITTLE)	IT PowerVR SGX544MP3 (tri-core) @ 480 MHz 49 GFLOPS (532 MHz in some full-screen apps)	32-bit dual-channel 800 MHz LPDDR3 (12.8 GB/sec)		Q2 2013	Samsung Galaxy S4 I9500, Hardkernel ODROID-XU, Meizu MX3, ZTE Grand S II TD ODROID-XU
Exynos 5 Octa (internally Exynos 5420)	28 nm HKMG	1.8-1.9 GHz quad-core ARM Cortex-A15 and 1.3 GHz quad-core ARM Cortex-A7 (ARM big.LITTLE with GTS)	ARM Mali-T628 MP6 @ 533 MHz; 109 GFLOPS	32-bit dual-channel 933 MHz LPDDR3e (14.9 GB/sec)		Q3 2013	Samsung Chromebook 2 11.6", Samsung Galaxy Note 3, Samsung Galaxy Note 10.1 (2014 Edition), Samsung Galaxy Note Pro 12.2, Samsung Galaxy Tab Pro (12.2 & 10.1), Arndale Octa Board, Galaxy S5 SM-G900H
Exynos 5 Octa (internally Exynos 5422)	28 nm HKMG	2.1 GHz quad-core ARM Cortex-A15 and 1.5 GHz quad-core ARM Cortex-A7 (ARM big.LITTLE with GTS)	ARM Mali-T628 MP6 @ 695 MHz (142 Gflops)	32-bit dual-channel 933 MHz LPDDR3/DDR3 (14.9 GB/sec)		Q2 2014	Galaxy S5 SM-G900, Hardkernel ODROID-XU3 & ODROID-XU4
Exynos 5 Octa (internally Exynos 5800)	28 nm HKMG	2.1 GHz quad-core ARM Cortex-A15 and 1.3 GHz quad-core ARM Cortex-A7 (ARM big.LITTLE with GTS)	ARM Mali-T628 MP6 @ 695 MHz (142 Gflops)	32-bit dual-channel 933 MHz LPDDR3/DDR3 (14.9 GB/sec)		Q2 2014	Samsung Chromebook 2 13,3"
Exynos 5 Hexa (internally Exynos 5260)	28 nm HKMG	1.7 GHz dual-core ARM Cortex-A15 and 1.3 GHz quad-core ARM Cortex-A7 (ARM big.LITTLE with GTS)	ARM Mali-T624	32-bit dual-channel 800 MHz LPDDR3 (12.8 GB/sec)		Q2 2014	Galaxy Note 3 Neo (announced January 31, 2014), Samsung Galaxy K zoom
Allwinner A80 Octa	28 nm HPm	Quad-core ARM Cortex-A15 and Quad-core ARM Cortex-A7 (ARM big.LITTLE with GTS)	PowerVR G6230 (Rogue)	32-bit dual-channel DDR3/DDR3L/LPDDR3 or LPDDR2			

== See also ==
- ARM architecture
- Comparison of ARMv7-A cores
- Comparison of ARMv8-A cores
- JTAG
- List of applications of ARM cores
- List of ARM cores
