= Bitmovin =

American multimedia technology company

bitmovin
- Type: Private
- Industry: Streaming media
- Founded: 2013; 13 years ago
- Founder: Christopher Mueller; Christian Timmerer; Stefan Lederer
- Headquarters: San Francisco, CA, United States
- Area served: Europe, North America, Asia, South America
- Website: bitmovin.com

Bitmovin is a multimedia technology company which provides services that transcode digital video and audio to streaming formats using cloud computing, and streaming media players. Founded in 2013, the Austrian company contributes to MPEG-DASH, an open standard that allows streaming video to be played in HTML video and Flash Video web players.

== History ==
Bitmovin was founded in 2013 after research and standardization in the area of MPEG-DASH at the University of Klagenfurt. In 2014 the company secured an investment round with the venture capital fond Speedinvest and Constantia Industries. In 2014, the company was part of the top 100 companies in online media. Bitmovin is the author of the MPEG-DASH reference software libdash and contributes to the standardization at MPEG, DASH-IF, IETF, etc.

In 2015, Bitmovin participated in the YCombinator program.

== Products ==
The company provides the cloud-based transcoding service bitcodin, which increases the efficiency of transcoding by using Cloud computing, and also enables transcoding of ultra-high definition video.

The company also created the HTML media and Flash-based web player bitdash which can be used in Web Browsers on desktop computers and smartphones. This player supports the streaming and playback of MPEG-DASH or Apple's HTTP Live Streaming, using either the Media Source Extensions or Flash, depending on the platform. DRM is enabled through the usage of the Encrypted Media Extensions as well as Flash. It is compatible to tools such as x264 or MP4Box.

== Usage ==
- Live or on-demand transcoding of video or audio streaming to HLS, progressive and DASH
- Web-based players for streaming for HLS, progressive and DASH content in HTML video or Flash Video
- Streaming of DRM protected content in HTML video
