= Samsung Galaxy Tab Pro 8.4 =

Android tablet by Samsung

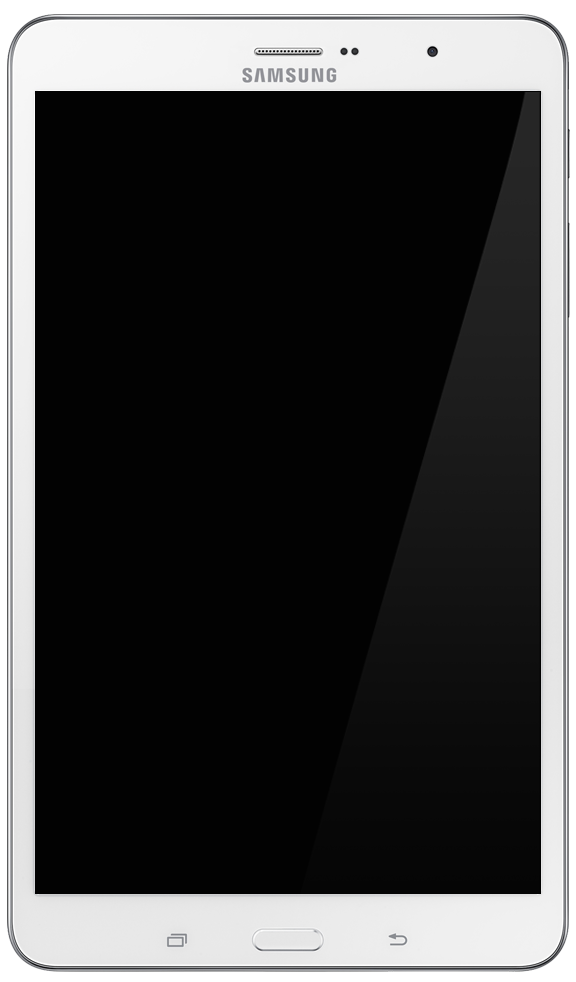
- Samsung Galaxy Tab Pro 8.4 in White
- Also known as: SM-T320 (WiFi); SM-T321 (3G & WiFi); SM-T325 (3G, 4G/LTE & WiFi)
- Manufacturer: Samsung Electronics
- Product family: Galaxy Tab
- Type: Tablet, media player, PC
- Released: February 19, 2014
- Operating system: Android 4.4.2 "KitKat"
- System on a chip: Qualcomm Snapdragon 800 or Exynos octa-core
- CPU: 2.3 GHz quad-core Krait 400 SoC processor
- Memory: 2 GB
- Storage: 16/32 GB flash memory, microSDXC slot (up to 128 GB)
- Display: 2560x1600 px (359 ppi), 8.4 in (21 cm) diagonal, Super Clear LCD
- Graphics: Adreno 330
- Input: Multi-touch screen, digital compass, gyroscope, proximity and ambient light sensors, accelerometer
- Camera: 8.0MP AF rear facing with LED flash, 2 MP front facing
- Connectivity: Cat3 100 Mbps DL, 50 Mbps UP Hexa-Band 800/850/900/1800/2100/2600 (4G & LTE model); HSPA+ 42/5.76 Mbit/s 850/900/1900/2100 (4G & LTE model); HSPA+ 21/5.76 Mbit/s Quad 850/900/1900/2100 MHz (3G & WiFi model); EDGE/GPRS Quad 850/900/1800/1900 (3G & WiFi model); Wi-Fi 802.11a/b/g/n/ac (2.4 & 5GHz), Bluetooth 4.0, HDMI (external cable)
- Power: 4,800 mAh Li-Ion battery
- Dimensions: 219 mm (8.6 in) H 128.5 mm (5.06 in) W 7.2 mm (0.28 in) D
- Weight: WiFi: 334 g (0.736 lb); 3G: 336 g (0.741 lb); 4G/LTE: 338 g (0.745 lb)
- Successor: Samsung Galaxy Tab S2 8.0
- Related: Samsung Galaxy Tab Pro 10.1; Samsung Galaxy Tab Pro 12.2; Samsung Galaxy Note Pro 12.2; Samsung Galaxy Tab S 8.4
- Website: http://www.samsung.com/global/microsite/galaxypro/

The Samsung Galaxy Tab Pro 8.4 is an 8.4-inch Android-based tablet computer produced and marketed by Samsung Electronics. It belongs to the high-end "Pro" line of the Samsung Galaxy Tab series, which also includes a 10.1-inch and a 12.2-inch model, the Samsung Galaxy Tab Pro 10.1 and the Galaxy Tab Pro 12.2. It was announced on 6 January 2014, and was released in the US on 19 February, starting at $399. This is Samsung's first 8.4-inch tablet which is designed to be a direct competitor against the LG G Pad 8.3.

== History ==
The Galaxy Tab Pro 8.4 was announced on 6 January 2014. It was shown along with the Galaxy Note Pro 12.2, Tab Pro 12.2, and Tab Pro 10.1 at the 2014 Consumer Electronics Show in Las Vegas.

== Features ==
The Galaxy Tab Pro 8.4 is released with Android 4.4.2 Kitkat. Samsung has customized the interface with its TouchWiz UX software. As well as the standard suite of Google apps, it has Samsung Apps such as ChatON, S Suggest, S Voice, S Translator, S Planner, WatchON, Smart Stay, Multi-Window, Group Play, and All Share Play.

Just a few weeks after being released, the tablet's Android operating system was officially updated to Android 4.4.2 Kitkat. The update has been rolled out in countries like the United Kingdom, Colombia, the United States, and many more. It brings some bug fixes, security enhancements and device performance improvements. It is available to users through OTA or through Samsung Kies.

The Galaxy Tab Pro 8.4 is available in WiFi-only, 3G & Wi-Fi, and 4G/LTE & WiFi variants. Storage ranges from 16 GB to 32 GB depending on the model, with a microSDXC card slot for expansion up to 64 GB. It has an 8.4-inch Super Clear LCD screen with a resolution of 2560x1600 pixels and a pixel density of 359 ppi. It also features a 2 MP front camera without flash and a rear-facing 8.0 MP AF camera with LED flash. It also has the ability to record HD videos.

== See also ==
- Samsung Galaxy Tab series
- Samsung Electronics
- Samsung Galaxy Tab Pro 10.1
- Samsung Galaxy Tab Pro 12.2
- Samsung Galaxy Note Pro 12.2
