= Samsung Galaxy Tab Pro 10.1 =

Android tablet by Samsung

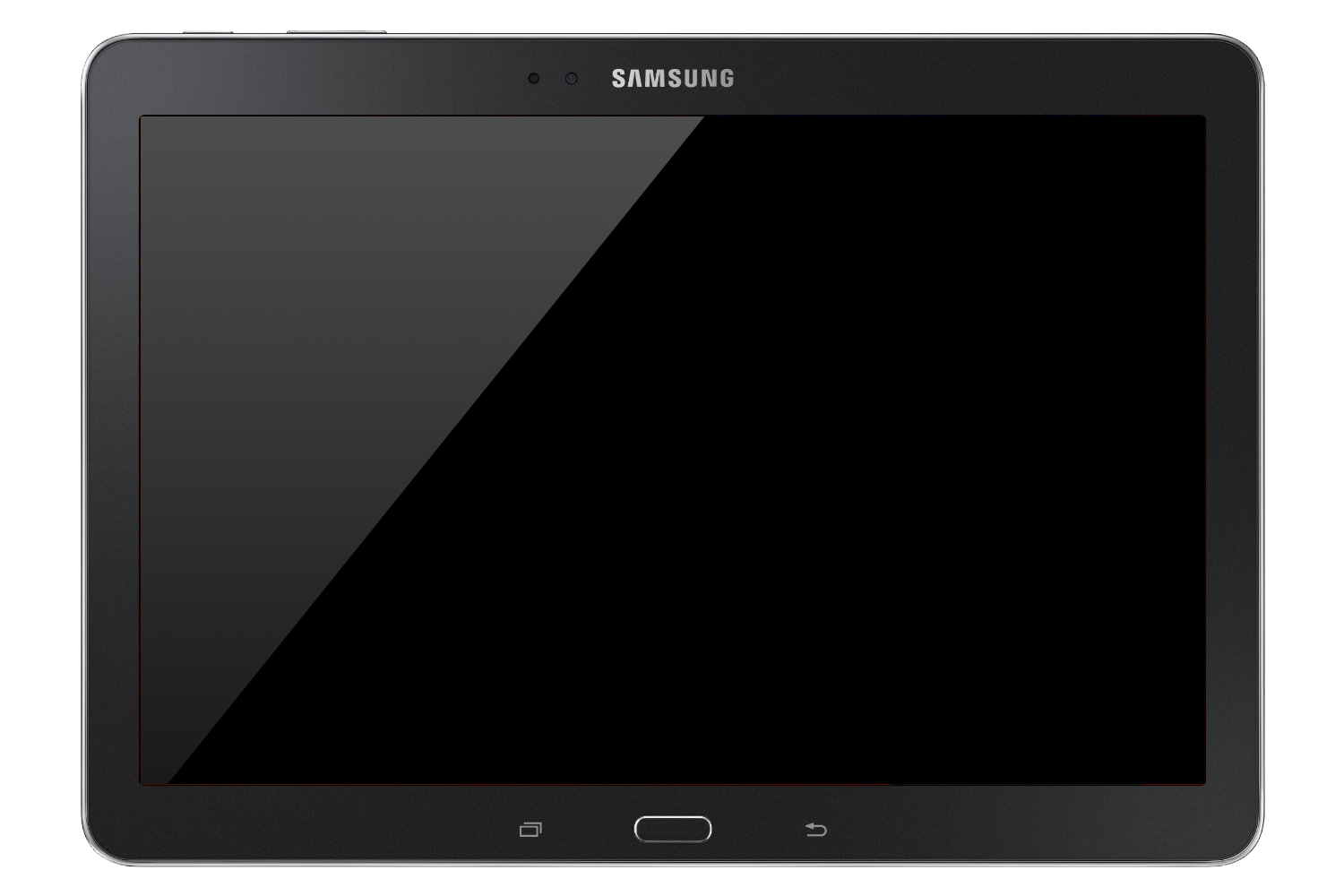
- Samsung Galaxy Tab Pro 10.1
- Also known as: SM-T520 (Wifi); SM-T525 (LTE, 3G & Wifi)
- Developer: Samsung
- Product family: Galaxy Tab
- Type: Tablet, media player, PC
- Released: February 2014
- Media: MP4, MP3, WMA, MPEG, 3GP, AAF, GIF, ASF, DAT, M4V, SVI, FLA, FLR, WRAP, PPG, Ogg, WMV
- Operating system: Android 4.4 "KitKat" with TouchWiz Nature UX
- System on a chip: Samsung Exynos 5420 (Wi-Fi model) or Snapdragon 800 (4G/LTE model)
- CPU: 1.9 GHz octa-core (1.9 GHz quad-core ARM Cortex-A15 and 1.3 GHz quad-core ARM Cortex-A7) (Wi-Fi model) or 2.3 GHz quad-core Krait (ARMv7-compatible) (4G/LTE model)
- Memory: 2 GB RAM
- Storage: 16/32 GB flash memory, microSDXC slot (up to 64 GB)
- Display: 2560×1600 pentile px, 299 ppi, 10.1 in (26 cm) diagonal, WQXGA TFT display
- Graphics: ARM Mali-T628MP6 (Wi-Fi model) or Adreno 330 (4G/LTE model)
- Input: Multi-touch screen, digital compass, proximity, gyroscope, accelerometer and ambient light sensors
- Camera: 8 MP rear facing, 2 MP front facing
- Connectivity: LTE 150 Mbps DL, 50 Mbps UL Hexa Band 800/850/900/1800/2100/2600 (4G & LTE model); HSPA+ 42/5.76 Mbit/s 850/900/1900/2100 (4G & LTE model); HSPA+ 21 Mbit/s 850/900/1900/2100 MHz (3G & Wi-Fi model); Wi-Fi 802.11a/b/g/n/ac (2.4 & 5 GHz), Bluetooth 4.0, HDMI (external cable), GPS
- Power: 8,220 mAh (43,6 Wh) Li-Ion battery
- Dimensions: 243.1 mm (9.57 in) H 171.4 mm (6.75 in) W 7.3 mm (0.29 in) D
- Weight: 477 g (1.052 lb)
- Successor: Samsung Galaxy Tab S 10.5
- Related: Samsung Galaxy Tab 3 10.1; Samsung Galaxy Note Pro 12.2; Samsung Galaxy Tab Pro 12.2; Samsung Galaxy Tab Pro 8.4
- Website: www.samsung.com/global/microsite/galaxypro/

The Samsung Galaxy Tab Pro 10.1 is a 10.1-inch Android-based tablet computer produced and marketed by Samsung Electronics. It belongs to the new generation of the Samsung Galaxy Tab series and Pro tablets, which also includes an 8.4-inch model, the Samsung Galaxy Tab Pro 8.4, a 12.2-inch Tab model, the Samsung Galaxy Tab Pro 12.2, and 12.2 inch Note model, the Samsung Galaxy Note Pro 12.2. It was announced on 6 January 2014. In the US it was released in February, starting at $499.

== History ==
The Galaxy Tab Pro 10.1 was announced on 6 January 2014. It was shown along with the Galaxy Note Pro 12.2, Tab Pro 12.2, and Tab Pro 8.4 at the 2014 Consumer Electronics Show in Las Vegas. It was released internationally on 6 March 2014.

== Features ==
The Galaxy Tab Pro 10.1 is released with Android 4.4 KitKat. Samsung has customized the interface with its TouchWiz UX software. As well as the standard suite of Google apps, it has Samsung apps such as ChatON, S Suggest, S Voice, Smart Remote (Peel) and All Share Play.

The Galaxy Tab Pro 10.1 is available in both Wi-Fi-only and 4G/LTE & Wi-Fi variants. Storage ranges from 16 GB to 32 GB depending on the model(the 32 GB has yet to be released and no date is available at this time), with a microSDXC card slot for expansion. It has a 10.1-inch WQXGA TFT screen with a resolution of 2560x1600 pixels and a pixel density of 299 ppi. It also features a 2 MP front camera and an 8 MP rear-facing camera. It also has the ability to record HD videos.
