= JW Player =

Software company

- Type: Private
- Founded: 2005; 21 years ago
- Founder: Jeroen Wijering
- Headquarters: New York City, New York
- Website: jwplayer.com

JW Player is a New York based company that has developed video player software of the same name. The player, for embedding videos onto web pages, is used by news, video hosting companies, and for self-hosted web videos. The company has also created the video management software "JW Platform", formerly known as "Bits On The Run".

== History ==
JW Player was developed in 2005, initially as an open-source project. In December 2015, JW Player stated that their software is no longer offered with an open-source license; instead it is offered with a Creative Commons license for non-commercial use. The software is named after the founder and initial developer Jeroen Wijering. It initially was distributed via Wijering's blog. In about 2007 it was integrated into the advertising company named LongTail, which was renamed after the software in 2013. In 2008 a company, headquartered in New York, was formed which continued to develop and distribute the player.

During the early development, before it was purchased by Google, YouTube videos were streamed by JW Player. In 2015, JW Player was rewritten to reduce size and load time. Version 7 was licensed under the proprietary Creative Commons Attribution-NonCommercial-ShareAlike 3.0 license. It had integrated support for HTML video and Flash Video, allowing video to be watched on phones, tablets and computers. That year the company's paying customer base grew by more than 40 percent to 15,000, 60% from the USA. 2.5 million websites used the free edition, playing about a billion videos per month.

In 2016, the company released a new simpler-to-use version of its product, entitled JW Showcase. JW Player continues to be used by many companies, including ESPN, Electronic Arts, and AT&T.

In October 2024, JW Player and Connatix announced their merger, JWP Connatix.

== Acquisitions ==
JW Player acquired VUALTO in May 2021. In 2023, London, UK-based company InPlayer was purchased for an undisclosed amount.

== Features and licensing ==
JW Player is proprietary software. There is a basic free of cost version distributed under the Creative Commons Attribution-NonCommercial-ShareAlike 3.0 United States (CC BY-NC-SA) license in which videos are displayed with an overlaid company watermark, and a commercial 'software as a service' version.

JW Player supports MPEG-DASH (only in paid version), Digital rights management (DRM) (in collaboration with Vualto), interactive advertisement, and customization of the interface through Cascading Style Sheets.
