= Samsung Galaxy Note Pro 12.2 =

2014 Android tablet by Samsung

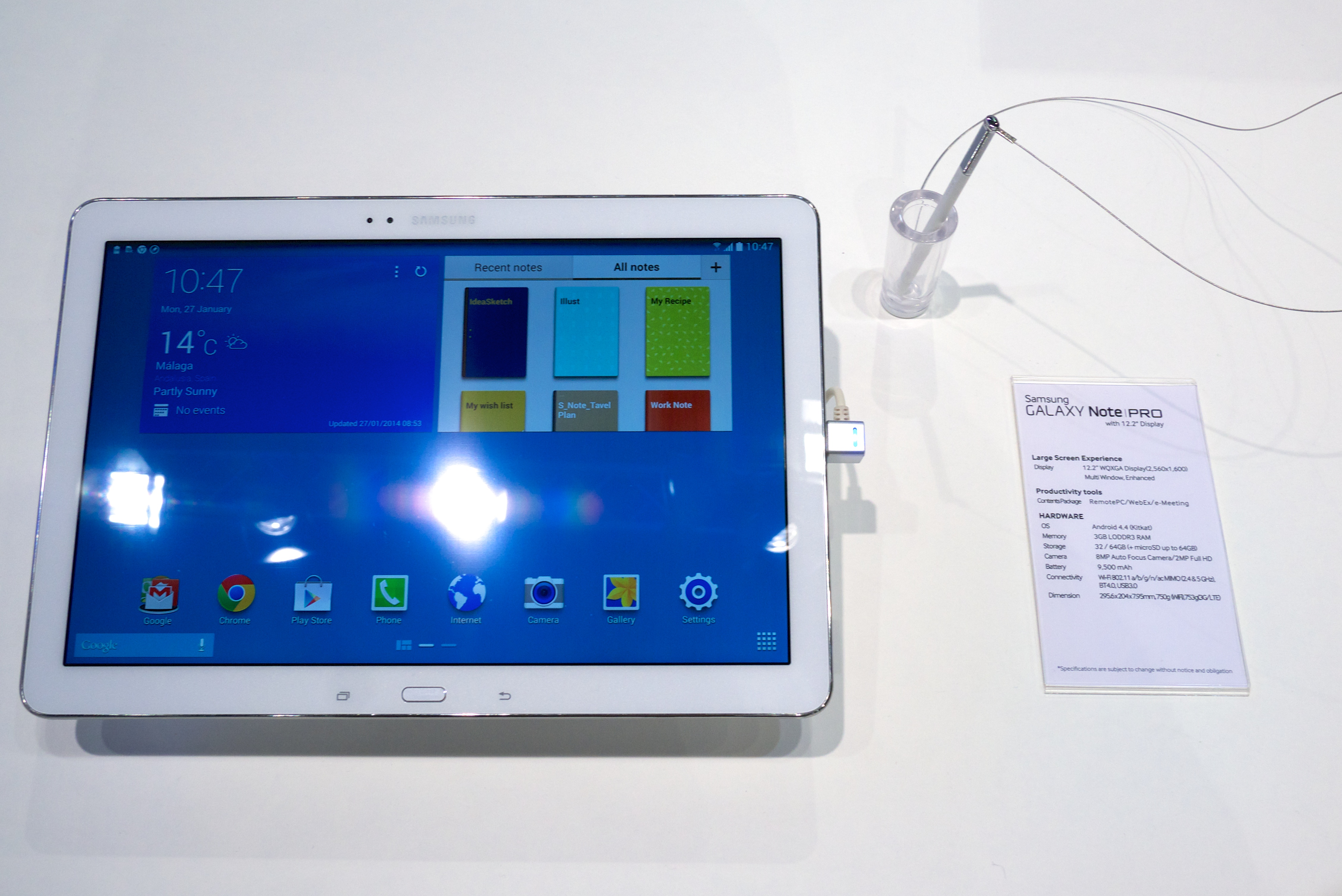
- Samsung Galaxy Note Pro 12.2
- Also known as: SM-P900 (Wifi); SM-P901 (3G & Wifi); SM-P902 (3G & Wifi, Turkey); SM-P905 (LTE, 3G & Wifi)
- Developer: Samsung
- Product family: Galaxy Note
- Type: Tablet, media player, PC
- Released: P900 9 February 2014
- Media: MP4, MP3, WMA, MPEG, 3GP, AAF, GIF, ASF, DAT, M4V, SVI, FLA, FLR, WRAP, PPG, Ogg, WMV
- Operating system: Android 4.4.2 "KitKat" with TouchWiz UX upgradable to Android 5.0.2 "Lollipop"
- CPU: 1.9 and 1.3 GHz octa-core Samsung Exynos 5420 SoC processor (Wi-Fi); 2.3 GHz quad-core Snapdragon 800 SoC processor (4G/LTE)
- Memory: 3 GB
- Storage: 32/64 GBi flash memory, microSDXC slot (up to 128 GiB)
- Display: 2560×1600 px, 247 ppi, 16:10 aspect ratio, 12.2 in (310 mm) diagonal, WQXGA TFT display (4 megapixels)
- Graphics: ARM Mali-T628MP6 (wifi model) or Adreno 330 (4G/LTE model)
- Input: Multi-touch screen, Wacom digitizer, digital compass, proximity, gyroscope, accelerometer and ambient light sensors
- Camera: 8 MP rear facing with LED flash, 2 MP front facing
- Connectivity: LTE 150 Mb/s DL, 50 Mb/s UL Hexa Band 800/850/900/1800/2100/2600 (4G & LTE model); HSPA+ 42/5.76 Mb/s 850/900/1900/2100 (4G & LTE model); HSPA+ 21 Mb/s 850/900/1900/2100 MHz (3G & wifi model); Wi-Fi 802.11a/b/g/n/ac (2.4 & 5 GHz), Bluetooth 4.0, HDMI (external cable)
- Power: 9,500 mAh Li-Ion battery
- Dimensions: 295.6 mm (11.64 in) H 204 mm (8.0 in) W 7.95 mm (0.313 in) D
- Weight: 750 g (1.65 lb) (Wi-Fi), 753 g (1.660 lb) (3G/LTE)
- Successor: Samsung Galaxy Tab S8 Ultra
- Related: Samsung Galaxy Note 3 Samsung Galaxy Note 10.1 2014 Edition; Samsung Galaxy Tab Pro 12.2; Samsung Galaxy Tab Pro 10.1; Samsung Galaxy Tab Pro 8.4
- Website: http://www.samsung.com/global/microsite/galaxypro/

The Samsung Galaxy Note Pro 12.2 is a 12.2-inch Android-based tablet computer produced and marketed by Samsung Electronics. It belongs to the generation of the Samsung Galaxy Note series and Pro tablets, which also includes an 8.4-inch model, the Samsung Galaxy Tab Pro 8.4, a 10.1-inch model, the Samsung Galaxy Tab Pro 10.1, and another 12.2 inch model, the Samsung Galaxy Tab Pro 12.2. It was announced on 6 January 2014, and was released on February 13 in the US, starting at $749.

== History ==
The Galaxy Note Pro 12.2 was announced on 6 January 2014. It was shown along with the Galaxy Tab Pro 12.2, Tab Pro 10.1, and Tab Pro 8.4 at the 2014 Consumer Electronics Show in Las Vegas.

== Features ==
The Galaxy Note Pro 12.2 was released with Android 4.4.2 KitKat. Samsung had customized the interface with its TouchWiz UX software. As well as apps from Google, including Google Play, Gmail and YouTube, it had access to Samsung apps such as ChatON, S Suggest, S Voice, Smart Remote (Peel) and All Share Play. Additional pen-oriented features and apps had been added to the Note Pro 12.2 namely Air Command menu which provided shortcuts to pen-oriented features such as Action Memos (on-screen sticky notes that use handwriting recognition to detect their contents and provide relevant actions such as looking up addresses on Google Maps and dialling phone numbers), Screen Write which is an annotation tool, Pen Window which allowed users to draw pop-up windows to run certain apps inside, the search tool S Finder, Scrapbook, and an updated version of S Note. Unlike its predecessor the Note 10.1 which has My Magazine, a news aggregator app that was accessible by swiping up from the bottom of the screen, this feature is missing.

The Galaxy Note Pro 12.2 was available in Wi-Fi-only (SM-P900), and 4G/LTE & Wi-Fi (SM-907A and SM-P905) variants. Storage ranged from 16 to 64 GiB depending on the model, with a microSDXC card slot for expansion. It had a 12.2-inch WQXGA TFT screen with a resolution of 2560×1600 pixels. It also featured a 2 MP front camera and an 8 MP rear-facing camera, and could record HD videos.

== See also ==
- Samsung Galaxy Note series
- Samsung Electronics
- Samsung Galaxy Note 10.1 2014 Edition
