= HTML video =

HTML element

HTML video is a subject of the HTML specification as the standard way of playing video via the web. Introduced in HTML5, it is designed to partially replace the object element and the previous de facto standard of using the proprietary Adobe Flash plugin, though early adoption was hampered by lack of agreement as to which video coding formats and audio coding formats should be supported in web browsers. As of 2020, HTML video is the only widely supported video playback technology in modern browsers, with the Flash plugin being phased out.

== History of <video> element ==
The <video> element started being discussed by the WHATWG in October 2006. The <video> element was proposed by Opera Software in February 2007. Opera also released a preview build that was showcased the same day, and a manifesto that called for video to become a first-class citizen of the web.

== <video> element examples ==
The following HTML code fragment will embed a WebM video into a web page.

<video src="movie.webm" poster="movie.jpg" controls>
	This is fallback content to display for user agents that do not support the video tag.
</video>

The "controls" attribute enables the browser's own user interface for controlling playback. Alternatively, playback can be controlled with JavaScript, which the web designer can use to create a custom user interface. The optional "poster" attribute specifies an image to show in the video's place before playback is started. Its purpose is to be representative of the video.

=== Multiple sources ===
Video format support varies among browsers (see below), so a web page can provide video in multiple formats. For other features, browser sniffing is used sometimes, which may be error-prone: any web developer's knowledge of browsers will inevitably be incomplete or not up-to-date. The browser in question "knows best" what formats it can use. The "video" element supports fallback through specification of multiple sources. Using any number of <source> elements, as shown below, the browser will choose automatically which file to download. Alternatively, the JavaScript canPlayType() function can be used to achieve the same. The "type" attribute specifies the MIME type and possibly a list of codecs, which helps the browser to determine whether it can decode the file without beginning to download it. The MIME type denotes the container format of the file, and the container format defines the interpretation of the codec string.

<video poster="poster.jpg" controls>
	<source src="av1.mp4" type='video/mp4; codecs="av01.0.00M.08, opus"'>
	<source src="avc.mp4" type='video/mp4; codecs="avc1.4D401E, mp4a.40.2"'>
	<source src="vp9.webm" type='video/webm; codecs="vp9.0, opus"'>
	<source src="theora.ogv" type='video/ogg; codecs="theora, vorbis"'>
	<p>This is fallback content to display for user agents that do not support the video tag.</p>
</video>

== Supported video and audio formats ==
The HTML specification does not specify which video and audio formats browsers should support. User agents are free to support any video formats they feel are appropriate, but content authors cannot assume that any video will be accessible by all complying user agents, since user agents have no minimal set of video and audio formats to support.

The HTML5 Working Group considered it desirable to specify at least one video format which all user agents (browsers) should support. The ideal format in this regard would:

- Have good compression, good image quality, and low decode processor use.
- Be royalty-free.
- In addition to software decoders, a hardware video decoder should exist for the format, as many embedded processors do not have the performance to decode video.

Initially, Ogg Theora was the recommended standard video format in HTML5, because it was not affected by any known patents. But on 10 December 2007, the HTML5 specification was updated, replacing the reference to concrete formats:

User agents should support Theora video and Vorbis audio, as well as the Ogg container format.

with a placeholder:

It would be helpful for interoperability if all browsers could support the same codecs. However, there are no known codecs that satisfy all the current players: we need a codec that is known to not require per-unit or per-distributor licensing, that is compatible with the open source development model, that is of sufficient quality as to be usable, and that is not an additional submarine patent risk for large companies. This is an ongoing issue and this section will be updated once more information is available.

The result was a polarisation of HTML video between industry-standard, ISO-defined but patent-encumbered formats, and open formats. The new AV1 format by Alliance for Open Media aims to be both industry standard, royalty-free, and open, and has wide industry support.

=== Free formats ===
Mozilla and Opera initially supported only the open formats of Theora and WebM. Although Theora is not affected by known non-free patents, Apple expressed concern about unknown patents that might affect it, whose owners might be waiting for a corporation with extensive financial resources to use the format before suing. Formats like H.264 might also be subject to unknown patents in principle, but they have been deployed much more widely and so it is presumed that any patent-holders would have already made themselves known. Apple also opposed requiring Ogg format support in the HTML standard (even as a "should" requirement) on the grounds that some devices might support other formats much more easily, and that HTML has historically not required particular formats for anything.

Some web developers criticized the removal of the Ogg formats from the specification. A follow-up discussion also occurred on the W3C questions and answers blog.

==== MPEG-DASH Support via the Media Source Extensions (MSE) ====
The adaptive bitrate streaming standard MPEG-DASH can be used in Web browsers via the Media Source Extensions (MSE) and JavaScript-based DASH players. Such players are, e.g., the open-source project dash.js of the DASH Industry Forum, but there are also products such as the HTML5 Video Player of Bitmovin (using HTML with JavaScript, but also a Flash-based DASH players for legacy Web browsers not supporting the MSE).

==== Google's purchase of On2 ====
Google's acquisition of On2 in 2010 resulted in its acquisition of the VP8 video format. Google has provided a royalty-free license to use VP8. Google also started WebM, which combines the standardized open source VP8 video codec with Vorbis audio in a Matroska based container. The opening of VP8 was welcomed by the Free Software Foundation.

When Google announced in January 2011 that it would end native support of H.264 in Chrome, criticism came from many quarters including Peter Bright of Ars Technica and Microsoft web evangelist Tim Sneath, who compared Google's move to declaring Esperanto the official language of the United States. However, Haavard Moen of Opera Software strongly criticized the Ars Technica article and Google responded to the reaction by clarifying its intent to promote WebM in its products on the basis of openness.

After the launch of WebM, Mozilla and Opera have called for the inclusion of VP8 in HTML.

On 7 March 2013, Google Inc. and MPEG LA, LLC announced agreements covering techniques that "may be essential" to VP8, with Google receiving a license from MPEG LA and 11 patent holders, and MPEG LA ending its efforts to form a VP8 patent pool.

In 2012, VP9 was released by Google as a successor to VP8, also open and royalty free.

At the end of 2017 the new AV1 format developed by the Alliance for Open Media (AOMedia) as the evolution of VP9 has reached the feature freeze, and the bitstream freeze is expected for January 2018. Firefox nightly builds already include support for AV1.

=== Non-free formats ===
H.264/MPEG-4 AVC is widely used, and has good speed, compression, hardware decoders, and video quality, but is patent-encumbered. Users of H.264 need licenses either from the individual patent holders, or from the MPEG LA, a group of patent holders including Microsoft and Apple, except for some Internet broadcast video uses. H.264 is usually used in the MP4 container format, together with Advanced Audio Coding (AAC) audio. AAC is also covered by patents in itself, so users of MP4 will have to license both H.264 and AAC.

In June 2009, the WHATWG concluded that no existing format was suitable as a specified requirement.

Apple still only supports H.264, but Microsoft now supports VP9 and WebM, and has pledged support for AV1.

==== Cisco makes a licensed H.264 binary module freely available ====
On 30 October 2013, Cisco announced that it was making a binary H.264 module available for download. Cisco will pay the costs of patent licensing for those binary modules when downloaded by the using software while it is being installed, making H.264 free to use in that specific case.

In the announcement, Cisco cited its desire of furthering the use of the WebRTC project as the reason, since WebRTC's video chat feature will benefit from having a video format supported in all browsers. The H.264 module will be available on "all popular or feasibly supportable platforms, which can be loaded into any application".

Cisco is also planning to publish source code for those modules under BSD license, but without paying the royalties, so the code will practically be free software only in countries without H.264 software patents, which has already been true about other existing implementations.

Also on 30 October 2013, Mozilla's Brendan Eich announced that Firefox would automatically download Cisco's H.264 module when needed by default. He also noted that the binary module is not a perfect solution, since users do not have full free software rights to "modify, recompile, and redistribute without license agreements or fees". Thus Xiph and Mozilla continue the development of Daala.

OpenH264 only supports the baseline profile of H.264, and does not by itself address the need for an AAC decoder. Therefore, it is not considered sufficient for typical MP4 web video, which is typically in the high profile with AAC audio. However, for use in WebRTC, the omission of AAC was justified in the release announcement: "the standards bodies have aligned on Opus and G.711 as the common audio codecs for WebRTC". There is doubt as to whether a capped global licensing of AAC, like Cisco's for H.264, is feasible after AAC's licensing bureau removed the price cap shortly after the release of OpenH264.

== Browser support ==
This table shows which video formats are likely to be supported by a given user agent. Most of the browsers listed here use a multimedia framework for decoding and display of video, instead of incorporating such software components. It is not generally possible to tell the set of formats supported by a multimedia framework without querying it, because that depends on the operating system and third party codecs. In these cases, video format support is an attribute of the framework, not the browser (or its layout engine), assuming the browser properly queries its multimedia framework before rejecting unknown video formats. In some cases, the support listed here is not a function of either codecs available within the operating system's underlying media framework, or of codec capabilities built into the browser, but rather could be by a browser add-on that might, for example, bypass the browser's normal HTML parsing of the <video> tag to embed a plug-in based video player.

Note that a video file normally contains both video and audio content, each encoded in its own format. The browser has to support both the video and audio formats. See HTML audio for a table of which audio formats are supported by each browser.

The video format can be specified by MIME type in HTML (see example). MIME types are used for querying multimedia frameworks for supported formats.

Of these browsers, only Firefox and Opera employ libraries for built-in decoding. In practice, Internet Explorer and Safari can also guarantee certain format support, because their manufacturers also make their multimedia frameworks. At the other end of the scale, Konqueror has identical format support to Internet Explorer when run on Windows, and Safari when run on Mac, but the selected support here for Konqueror is the typical for Linux, where Konqueror has most of its users. In general, the format support of browsers is much dictated by conflicting interests of vendors, specifically that Media Foundation and QuickTime support commercial standards, whereas GStreamer and Phonon cannot legally support other than free formats by default on the free operating systems that they are intended for.

Status of video format support in each web browser
Browser	Operating System	Theora (Ogg)	H.264 (MP4)	HEVC (MP4)	VP8 (WebM)	VP9 (WebM)	AV1 (WebM)
Android browser	Android	Since 2.3	Since 3.0	Since 5.0	Since 2.3	Since 4.4	Since 10
Chromium	Unix-like and Windows	Since r18297	Via FFmpeg	No	Since r47759	Since r172738	Yes
Google Chrome	Unix-like, Android, macOS, and Windows	Since 3.0	Since 3.0 (Note: On 11 January 2011 the removal of support for H.264 was announced on Chromium Blog. As of 7 November 2016 neither actual support was removed, nor the change to this plan was announced.)	Since 105 (software decoding; needs OS-level codecs) Since 107 (hardware decoding; needs hardware decoder)	Since 6.0	Since 29.0 (Note: VP9 support in 25, turned off by default. Enabled by default in version 29.)	Since 70
Internet Explorer	Windows	Via OpenCodecs	Since 9.0	No	Via OpenCodecs	No	No
Internet Explorer	Windows Phone	No	Since 9.0	No	No	No	No
Internet Explorer	Windows RT	No	Since 10.0	No	No	No	No
Microsoft Edge	Unix-like, macOS and Windows (Chromium)	Since v79	Since v79 (only browser to support DRM PlayReady)	No	Since v79	Since v79	Since v79
Microsoft Edge	Windows 10 (Legacy EdgeHTML)	Since 17.0 (with Web Media Extensions)	Since 12.0	Needs hardware decoder (Note: Available if the device has hardware support for HEVC. No software decoding support was included because "HEVC is very computationally complex, this will provide a more consistent experience.")	Since 17.0 (supports <video> tag with Web Media Extensions and VP9 Video Extensions)	Only enabled by default if hardware decoder present Since 17.0 (supports <video> tag with Web Media Extensions and VP9 Video Extensions)	Since 18.0 (with AV1 Video Extension)
Microsoft Edge	Windows 10 Mobile	No	Since 13.0	Needs hardware decoder	Since 15.0 (only via MSE)	Since 14.0 (only via MSE)	No
Konqueror	Unix-like and Windows	Needs OS-level codecs (Note: Any format supported by Phonon backend. Available Phonon backends include DirectShow, QuickTime, GStreamer and xine; backends using MPlayer and VLC are in development.)					
Mozilla Firefox	Windows	Since 3.5	Since 21.0 (Note: As of version 20, prefed off by default. Enabled by default beginning in version 21.)	Since Firefox 134 with hardware support or Microsoft Extension	Since 4.0	Since 28.0	Since 65.0 (64-bit); Since 66.0 (32-bit)
Mozilla Firefox	Linux	Since 3.5	26.0 (via GStreamer) (Note: Disabled by default until version 26. Also, depends on the codec on the system.); 43.0 (via FFmpeg)	Since 137 with hardware support or FFmpeg	Since 4.0	Since 28.0	Since 67.0
Mozilla Firefox	Android	Since 3.5	Since 17.0	Since 137 with hardware support	Since 4.0	Since 28.0	Since 113.0
Mozilla Firefox	macOS	Since 3.5	Since 34.0	Since 136 with hardware or software support	Since 4.0	Since 28.0	Since 66.0
Opera Mobile	Android, iOS, Symbian, and Windows Mobile	Since 13.0	Since 11.50	No	Since 15.0	Since 16.0	since 57.0
Opera	macOS, Windows	Since 10.50	Since 24.0	No	Since 10.60	Yes	since 57.0
Opera	Linux	Since 10.50	Needs codec library (Note: A later version of libffmpeg.so has to be installed.)	No	Since 10.60	Yes	since 57.0
Safari	iOS	No	Since 3.1	Since 11	Since 17.4 (fully supported); Since 12.1 (only via WebRTC)	Since 17.4 (fully supported); Since 14 (only via WebRTC)	Since 17.0 (needs hardware decoder; needs MP4 container) (Note: The iPhone 15 Pro, iPhone 15 Pro Max, and any Mac with an Apple M3 SoC support AV1 hardware decoding.)
Safari	macOS	Via Xiph QuickTime Components (macOS 10.11 and earlier)	Since 3.1	Since 11	Since 14.1	Since 14.1	Since 17.0 (needs hardware decoder; needs MP4 container)
GNOME Web	Linux and BSD	Needs OS-level codecs (Note: Any format supported by GStreamer on Webkit/GTK+. The support for Ogg Theora, WebM and h.264 formats is included with base, good, and bad plugins respectively.)					

=== Values ===
These indicate the level of support for the given item in each engine. By default, the most recent version of the engine is implied. However, a specific version number can be listed; when this indicates full support, it's the initial version of the engine fully supporting the item.

Legend
Value	Meaning
Yes	Fully supported
No	Has never been supported
Partial	Only some values are supported
Incorrect	Not implemented correctly in all cases
Experimental	May be incomplete or buggy
Nightly build	Currently in development; full support is expected
Depends	Only supported for the specified conditions
Dropped	No longer supported

== Transparent video ==
Transparent video, that is video with an alpha channel, has multiple design advantages:

- As it has no burnt-in background color / pattern / motif, you can change the background and/or neighboring objects in a web page any time later without the need to re-generate the video to fit into its surroundings properly, which was the far less flexible technique so far.
- You can very flexibly combine transparent videos with other elements (text, graphics, other videos or dynamically rendered content such as SVG or canvas) to achieve very dynamic layering effects.
- It opens a whole lot of possibilities also in terms of responsive web design.

=== Web browser support for videos with alpha channel ===
- Chrome supports VP8 and VP9 encoded videos with an alpha channel served in a WebM container, since version 31 in 2013-07.
- Safari supports HEVC encoded videos with an alpha channel served in a MP4 container, since iOS 13 (2019-09) and macOS Catalina (2019-10).
- There are some other proprietary polyfill / legacy solutions with a JavaScript based video player playing back a video which upon upload to the SaaS server got converted into a proprietary video format.

=== Earlier solutions ===
- Before the HTML5 era the only way to play back transparent video was by the help of Adobe Flash Player and using the transparent flag in its embedding code.

== Digital rights management (Encrypted Media Extensions) ==
HTML has support for digital rights management (DRM, restricting how content can be used) via the Encrypted Media Extensions (EME). The addition of DRM is controversial because it allows restricting users' freedom to use media restricted by DRM, even where fair use gives users the legal right to do so. A main argument in W3C's approval of EME was that the video content would otherwise be delivered in plugins and apps, and not in the web browser.

In 2013 Netflix added support for HTML video using EME, beside their old delivery method using a Silverlight plugin (also with DRM).

== Usage ==
In 2010, in the wake of Apple iPad launch and after Steve Jobs announced that Apple mobile devices would not support Flash, a number of high-profile sites began to serve H.264 HTML video instead of Adobe Flash for user-agents identifying as iPad. HTML video was not as widespread as Flash videos, though there were rollouts of experimental HTML-based video players from DailyMotion (using Ogg Theora and Vorbis format), YouTube (using the H.264 and WebM formats), and Vimeo (using the H.264 format).

Support for HTML video has been steadily increasing. In June 2013, Netflix added support for HTML video. In January 2015, YouTube switched to using HTML video instead of Flash by default. In December 2015, Facebook switched from Flash to HTML video for all video content.

As of 2016, Flash is still widely installed on desktops, while generally not being supported on mobile devices such as smartphones. The Flash plugin is widely assumed, including by Adobe, to be destined to be phased out, which will leave HTML video as the only widely supported method to play video on the World Wide Web. Chrome, Firefox, Safari, and Edge, have plans to make almost all flash content click to play in 2017. The only major browser which does not have announced plans to deprecate Flash is Internet Explorer. Adobe announced on 25 July 2017 that they would be permanently ending development of Flash in 2020.

== See also ==
- HTML audio
- Comparison of HTML5 and Flash
