= Samsung Galaxy Tab Pro 12.2 =

Android tablet by Samsung

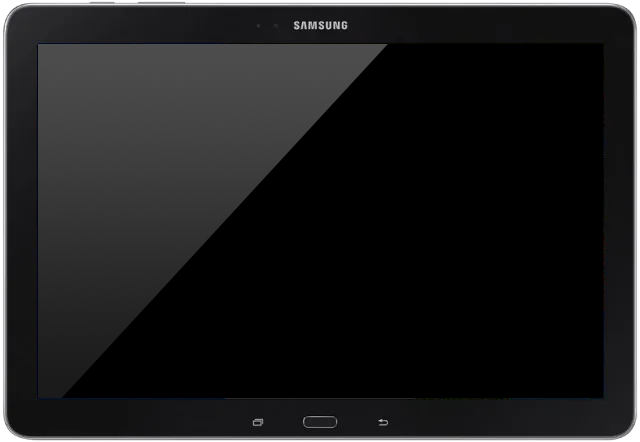
- Samsung Galaxy Tab Pro 12.2
- Also known as: SM-T900 (WiFi); SM-T905 (LTE, 3G & WiFi)
- Developer: Samsung
- Product family: Galaxy Tab
- Type: Tablet, media player, PC
- Media: MP4, MP3, WMA, MPEG, 3GP, AAF, GIF, ASF, DAT, M4V, SVI, FLA, FLR, WRAP, PPG, Ogg, WMV
- Operating system: Android 4.4.2 "KitKat" with TouchWiz Nature UX
- CPU: 1.9 GHz octa-core Samsung Exynos 5420 SoC processor (Wi-Fi) or 2.3 GHz quad-core Snapdragon 800 SoC processor (4G/LTE)
- Memory: 3 GB
- Storage: 16/32 GB flash memory, microSDXC slot (up to 64 GB)
- Display: 2560×1600 px, 12.2 in (31 cm) diagonal, WQXGA TFT Pentile display
- Graphics: ARM Mali-T628MP6 (Wi-Fi model) or Adreno 330 (4G/LTE model)
- Input: Multi-touch screen, digital compass, proximity, gyroscope, accelerometer and ambient light sensors
- Camera: 8 MP rear facing, 2 MP front facing
- Connectivity: LTE 150 Mbps DL, 50 Mbps UL Hexa Band 800/850/900/1800/2100/2600 (4G & LTE model); HSPA+ 42/5.76 Mbit/s 850/900/1900/2100 (4G & LTE model); HSPA+ 21 Mbit/s 850/900/1900/2100 MHz (3G & Wi-Fi model); Wi-Fi 802.11a/b/g/n/ac (2.4 & 5 GHz), Bluetooth 4.0, HDMI (external cable)
- Power: 9,500 mAh Li-Ion battery
- Dimensions: 295.6 mm (11.64 in) H 204 mm (8.0 in) W 8 mm (0.31 in) D
- Weight: 740 g (1.63 lb)
- Successor: Samsung Galaxy Tab S8 Ultra
- Related: Samsung Galaxy Tab 3 10.1; Samsung Galaxy Note Pro 12.2; Samsung Galaxy Tab Pro 10.1; Samsung Galaxy Tab Pro 8.4

The Samsung Galaxy Tab Pro 12.2 is a 12.2-inch Android-based tablet computer produced and marketed by Samsung Electronics. It belongs to the new generation of the Samsung Galaxy Tab series and Pro tablets, which also includes an 8.4-inch model, the Samsung Galaxy Tab Pro 8.4, a 10.1-inch model, the Samsung Galaxy Tab Pro 10.1, and another 12.2 inch model, the Samsung Galaxy Note Pro 12.2. It was announced on 6 January 2014. It was launched on March 9, 2014 with a price from $649 in the US. It is no longer compatible with Android or most apps.

== History ==
The Galaxy Tab Pro 12.2 was announced on 6 January 2014. It was shown along with the Galaxy Note Pro 12.2, Tab Pro 10.1, and Tab Pro 8.4 at the 2014 Consumer Electronics Show in Las Vegas.

== Features ==
The Galaxy Tab Pro 12.2 is released with Android 4.4.2 KitKat. Samsung has customized the interface with its TouchWiz UX software. As well as the standard Google apps, it has Samsung Apps such as ChatON, S Suggest, S Voice, Smart Remote (Peel) and All Share Play.

The Galaxy Tab Pro 12.2 is available in Wi-Fi-only, and 4G/LTE & Wi-Fi variants. Storage ranges from 32 GB to 64 GB depending on the model, with a microSDXC card slot for expansion. It has a 12.2-inch WQXGA TFT screen with a resolution of 2560x1600 pixel. It also features a 2 MP front camera and an 8 MP rear-facing camera. It also has the ability to record HD videos.

== See also ==
- Samsung Galaxy Tab Pro 8.4
- Samsung Galaxy Tab Pro 10.1
- Samsung Galaxy TabPro S

Preceded by -	Samsung Galaxy Tab Pro 12.2; 2014	Succeeded by None, latest model
