= Libdash =

libdash
- Developer(s): bitmovin, ITEC Team
- Initial release: February 1, 2013
- Stable release: 2.2 / 3 April 2013; 11 years ago
- Repository: github.com/bitmovin/libdash
- Written in: C++
- Type: Multimedia framework
- License: GNU LGPL
- Website: bitmovin.com

libdash is a computer software library which provides an object-oriented interface to the Dynamic Adaptive Streaming over HTTP (DASH) standard. It is also the official reference implementation of the ISO/IEC MPEG-DASH standard, and maintained by the Austrian company bitmovin. The libdash source code is open source, published at GitHub, and licensed under the GNU Lesser General Public License 2.1+.

The project contains a Qt-based sample multimedia player that is based on ffmpeg which uses libdash for the playback of DASH streams.
