= Arndale Board =

Single-board computer

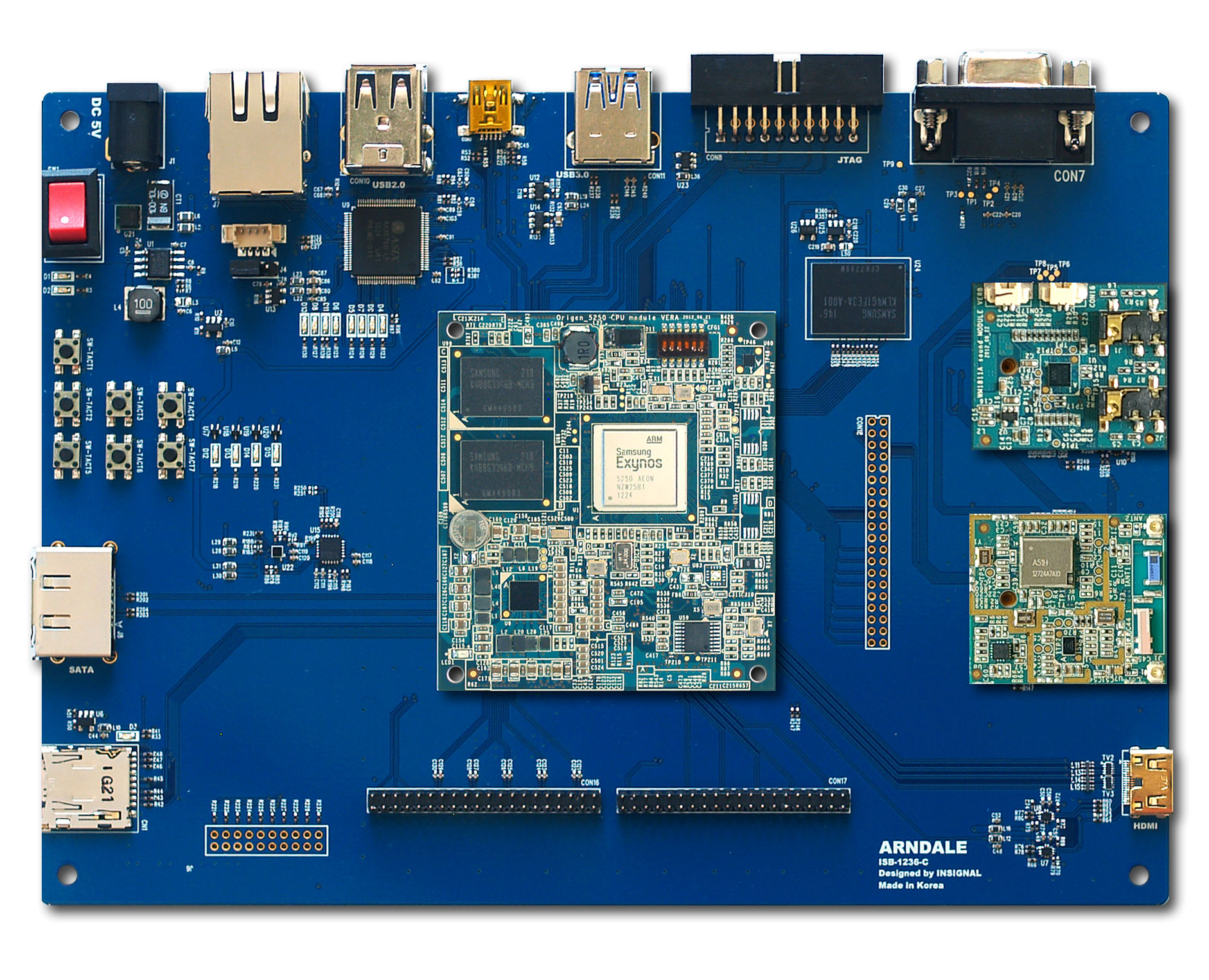
- Arndale-5250-A
- Developer: UNIBEST
- Type: Single-board computer
- Released: November 2012
- Website: www.arndaleboard.com

The Arndale Board is a high-power single-board computer featuring the ARM Cortex-A15 MPCore developed in South Korea.

== Overview ==
The Arndale Board is composed of four parts: the CPU Board, Base Board, Sound Board, and Connectivity Board.

== Hardware specifications ==
	Arndale Board
SoC:	Exynos 5250
CPU:	1.7 GHz dual-core ARM Cortex-A15
GPU:	ARM Mali-T604
Display Module:	MIPI-DSI 4 Lane and eDP interface support, 7-inch TFT LCD, Resolution 1024 × 600, Capacitive Touchscreen
WiFi+BT+GPS Module:	Samsung SWB-A51H (Wi-Fi, BT) + CSR GPS(G05t)
Camera Module:	MIPI-CSI and ITU601 interface support, 5 mp camera
Accessories:	AC Adapter (5V 5A), SATA SSD 120 GB or 240 GB (Sata To USB 3.0 cable or SATA cable+power cable), HDMI, Serial, USB, cable, SD card, etc.
Size:	140 mm[h] × 195 mm[w] × 20 mm[d]
Weight:	166 g
S/W:	U-boot 1.3.4, Linux kernel: 3.0.15, Android Version: Jelly Bean
