= Media Source Extensions =

Standard for JavaScript media streaming

MSE
- Media Source Extensions
- Abbreviation: EME, media-source
- Native name: Media Source Extensions
- Status: Candidate Recommendation
- Year started: 2013
- First published: January 29, 2013
- Latest version: Candidate Recommendation; November 17, 2016
- Preview version: Editor's draft April 21, 2021
- Organization: W3C; Google; Microsoft; Netflix
- Committee: HTML Media Extensions Working Group
- Editors: Matthew Wolenetz; Mark Watson; Former editors: Jerry Smith (until September 2017); Aaron Colwell (until April 2015); Adrian Bateman (until April 2015)
- Authors: HTML Media Extensions Working Group
- Base standards: HTML, Web IDL
- Related standards: Encrypted Media Extensions
- Domain: HTML video, HTML audio
- Website: Latest version: www.w3.org/TR/media-source/; Editor's draft: w3c.github.io/media-source/

Media Source Extensions (MSE) is a W3C specification that allows JavaScript to send byte streams to media codecs within web browsers that support HTML video and audio. Among other possible uses, this allows the implementation of client-side prefetching and buffering code for streaming media entirely in JavaScript. It is compatible with, but should not be confused with, the Encrypted Media Extensions (EME) specification, and neither requires the use of the other, although many EME implementations are only capable of decrypting media data provided via MSE.

Netflix announced experimental support in June 2014 for the use of MSE playback on the Safari browser on the OS X Yosemite beta release.

YouTube started using MSE in its HTML5 player in September 2013.

== Browser support ==
The Media Source Extensions API is widely supported across all modern web browsers, with the only exception being iPhone-family devices (although it is supported on iPadOS). Firefox 37 already had a subset of MSE API available for use with only YouTube in Firefox 37 on Windows Vista or later only, while Mac OS X version had in enabled starting version 38.

Browser support for Media Source Extensions
Desktop						Mobile devices					
Windows, Mac OS, Linux						iOS	Android				
Internet Explorer	Edge	Chrome	Firefox	Safari	Opera	All browsers	Edge	Chrome	Firefox	Opera	Samsung Internet
11.0	12+	23–30	38–41	8+	30+	iOS 13+	12+	92+	90+	64+	9.2+
		31+	42+								

=== Minor browsers ===
- Pale Moon from version 27.0, since 22 November 2016.

== Players ==
- Akamai's Adaptive Media Player, which includes Dash.js, HLS.js and advanced QUIC protocol playback from Akamai Edge Servers
- Google's Shaka Player, an open source javascript player library for HTML5 MSE and EME video with DASH and HLS support
- bitmovin's bitdash MPEG-DASH player for HTML5 MSE and EME, with Flash fallback
- dash.js, a reference implementation for HTML5 MSE and EME
- Canal+'s rx-player for HTML5 MSE and EME (Live and On Demand)
- Dailymotion's hls.js for HTML5 MSE
- JW Player 7 and later for MPEG-DASH using HTML5 MSE and EME
- Azure Media Player supports MSE, EME, DASH, HLS, Flash, and Silverlight. Streaming URLs are published in an ism/manifest
- Unreal HTML5 player uses MSE for low latency (sub-second) live playback of streams sent via WebSockets by Unreal Media Server

== See also ==
- HTML video
- Dynamic Adaptive Streaming over HTTP (DASH)
- WebRTC
