= DASH-IF =

The DASH Industry Forum (DASH-IF) is an organization that develops interoperability guidelines for the usage of the MPEG-DASH streaming standard. It includes streaming and media companies, such as Microsoft, Netflix, Google, Ericsson, Samsung and Adobe." An open-source version of the software is also available.

== Interoperability ==
One of the stated goals of the DASH Industry Forum is to support interoperability among DASH-enabled products."

The DASH Industry Forum has produced several documents as implementation guidelines:

- DASH-AVC/264 Interoperability Points V3.0: DRM updates, Improved Live, Ad Insertion, Events, H.265/HEVC support, Trick Modes, CEA608/708
- DASH-AVC/264 Interoperability Points V2.0: HD and Multi-Channel Audio Extensions
- DASH-AVC/264 Interoperability Points V1.0

== Specification and Industry Implementation ==
Dynamic Adaptive Streaming over HTTP (MPEG-DASH) is defined by the International Organization for Standardization (ISO) and the International Electrotechnical Commission (IEC) under ISO/IEC 23009. It shows how media content is described, organized into segments, and adapted to different network conditions using the Media Presentation Description (MPD). The standard also explains how to protect content with encryption and authentication and sets rules for timing, segment alignment, and playback consistency. Other parts of the ISO/IEC 23009 series cover related topics, such as guidelines for Common Media Application Format (CMAF) delivery, reference software, and testing tools that ensure compliance with MPEG-DASH.

The DASH Industry Forum (DASH-IF) is an organization that helps different DASH-based systems work together smoothly. It publishes implementation guidelines that recommend profiles, constraints, and interoperability points for different streaming scenarios DASH-IF also releases draft specifications and updates, including codec compatibility, Live streaming behavior, event signaling, and Metadata timing. .

DASH-IF distributes publicly accessible technical documentation that provides practical extensions to the standardized DASH specifications. These include the DASH-AVC/264 Interoperability Points, which describe how to implement DASH with AVC/H.264 video. Together, the ISO/IEC 23009 series and the DASH-IF guidelines serve as the main references for anyone building adaptive HTTP streaming systems.

== See also ==
- H.264/MPEG-4 AVC
