= MPEG Common Encryption =

MPEG Common Encryption (abbreviated MPEG-CENC) refers to a set of two MPEG standards governing different container formats:

- for ISOBMFF, Common encryption in ISO base media file format files (ISO/IEC 23001-7:2016)
- for MPEG-TS, Common encryption of MPEG-2 transport streams (ISO/IEC 23001-9:2016)

The specifications are compatible, so that conversion between the encrypted formats can happen without re-encryption. They define metadata, specific to each format, about which parts of the stream are encrypted and by which encryption scheme. Each encryption scheme may have different methods to retrieve the decryption key.

== Availability of the Standards ==
The standards can be purchased from iso.org, on paper and in digital forms. As of July 2016, the prices were 118 Swiss franc (US$122) for the ISOBMFF version, and 58 Swiss franc (US$60) for the TS version. An included copyright notice prohibits redistribution without written permission, also on local area networks. Each page is watermarked with the purchaser's name and company.
