= Avengers: Endgame =

2019 Marvel Studios film

- Theatrical release poster
- Directed by: Anthony Russo; Joe Russo
- Screenplay by: Christopher Markus; Stephen McFeely
- Based on: Avengers by: Stan Lee; Jack Kirby
- Produced by: Kevin Feige
- Starring: Robert Downey Jr.; Chris Evans; Mark Ruffalo; Chris Hemsworth; Scarlett Johansson; Jeremy Renner; Don Cheadle; Paul Rudd; Brie Larson; Karen Gillan; Danai Gurira; Benedict Wong; Jon Favreau; Bradley Cooper; Gwyneth Paltrow; Josh Brolin
- Cinematography: Trent Opaloch
- Edited by: Jeffrey Ford; Matthew Schmidt
- Music by: Alan Silvestri
- Production company: Marvel Studios
- Distributed by: Walt Disney Studios Motion Pictures
- Release dates: April 22, 2019 (Los Angeles Convention Center); April 26, 2019 (United States)
- Running time: 181 minutes
- Country: United States
- Language: English
- Budget: $356–400 million
- Box office: $2.942 billion

Avengers: Endgame is a 2019 American superhero film based on the Marvel Comics superhero team the Avengers. Produced by Marvel Studios and distributed by Walt Disney Studios Motion Pictures, it is the direct sequel to Avengers: Infinity War (2018) and the 22nd film in the Marvel Cinematic Universe (MCU). Directed by Anthony and Joe Russo and written by Christopher Markus and Stephen McFeely, the film features an ensemble cast that includes Robert Downey Jr., Chris Evans, Mark Ruffalo, Chris Hemsworth, Scarlett Johansson, Jeremy Renner, Don Cheadle, Paul Rudd, Brie Larson, Karen Gillan, Danai Gurira, Benedict Wong, Jon Favreau, Bradley Cooper, Gwyneth Paltrow, and Josh Brolin. In the film, the surviving members of the Avengers and their allies attempt to reverse Thanos's actions in Infinity War, which erased half of all life in the universe.

The film was announced in October 2014 as Avengers: Infinity War – Part 2, but Marvel Studios later removed this title. The Russo brothers joined as directors in April 2015, with Markus and McFeely signing on to write the script a month later. It is a conclusion to the story of the MCU up to that point, ending several main characters' story arcs. The plot revisits moments from earlier films, bringing back actors and settings from throughout the franchise. Filming began in August 2017 at Pinewood Atlanta Studios in Fayette County, Georgia, shooting back-to-back with Infinity War, and ended in January 2018. Additional filming took place in the Metro and downtown Atlanta areas, New York state, Scotland, and England. The official title was announced in December 2018. With an estimated budget range of $356–400 million, Endgame is one of the most expensive films ever produced.

Avengers: Endgame premiered at the Los Angeles Convention Center on April 22, 2019, and was released in the United States on April 26 as part of Phase Three of the MCU. The film received positive reviews from critics, with praise for its direction, acting, musical score, action scenes, visual effects, and emotional weight, with critics lauding its culmination of the 22-film story. It grossed $2.8 billion worldwide during its initial theatrical run, surpassing Infinity War's entire theatrical run in eleven days, setting several box-office records, and surpassing Avatar (2009) to become the highest-grossing film of all time. Endgame was nominated for Best Visual Effects at the 92nd Academy Awards, among numerous other accolades. Avatar reclaimed the record for highest-grossing film following a re-release in 2021. An extended version of Endgame, subtitled Encore, was released in theaters in September 2026 in anticipation of the film's sequel, Avengers: Doomsday, which is scheduled for release in December 2026. Encore earned $142.9 million, which helped the film once again surpass Avatar and become the highest-grossing film of all time, with a total gross of $2.94 billion. Another sequel, Avengers: Secret Wars, is scheduled to follow in December 2027.

== Plot ==
In 2018, 23 days after Thanos erased half of all life in the universe, (Note: Known as the Blip, and depicted in Avengers: Infinity War (2018)) Carol Danvers rescues Tony Stark and Nebula from deep space. They reunite with the remaining Avengers—Bruce Banner, Steve Rogers, Thor, Natasha Romanoff, and James Rhodes—and Rocket on Earth. Finding Thanos on an uninhabited planet, they plan to use the Infinity Stones to reverse his actions but learn that Thanos has destroyed them. Enraged, Thor decapitates Thanos.

Five years later, Scott Lang escapes from the Quantum Realm. (Note: In which he was trapped at the end of Ant-Man and the Wasp (2018)) Reaching the Avengers Compound, he informs Rogers and Romanoff that he experienced only five hours while trapped. Theorizing that the Quantum Realm allows time travel, they ask a reluctant Stark to help them retrieve the Stones from the past to reverse Thanos's present actions. Stark, Rocket, and Banner, who has merged his intelligence with the Hulk's strength, build a time machine. Banner theorizes that altering the past will not affect the present, since any changes will create alternate realities. Banner and Rocket travel to Norway, where they visit the Asgardian refugee settlement of New Asgard and recruit an overweight, despondent Thor. In Tokyo, Romanoff recruits Clint Barton, who became a vigilante after his family was erased.

Banner, Lang, Rogers, and Stark time-travel to New York City during Loki's attack in 2012. (Note: During the events of The Avengers (2012)) At the Sanctum Sanctorum, Banner convinces the Ancient One to give him the Time Stone after promising to return the Infinity Stones to their proper points in time. At Stark Tower, Rogers retrieves the Mind Stone from Hydra sleeper agents, but Stark and Lang's attempt to steal the Space Stone fails, allowing 2012-Loki to escape with it. Rogers and Stark travel to Camp Lehigh in 1970, where Stark obtains an earlier version of the Space Stone and encounters his father, Howard. Rogers steals Pym Particles from Hank Pym to return to the present, and sees his lost love, Peggy Carter.

Rocket and Thor travel to Asgard in 2013. (Note: During the events of Thor: The Dark World (2013)) Rocket extracts the Reality Stone from Jane Foster, while Thor is encouraged by his mother, Frigga, and retrieves his old hammer, Mjolnir. Barton, Romanoff, Nebula, and Rhodes travel to 2014. Nebula and Rhodes go to Morag and steal the Power Stone before Peter Quill can, (Note: As depicted in Guardians of the Galaxy (2014)) while Barton and Romanoff travel to Vormir. The Soul Stone's keeper, Red Skull, says that it can be acquired only by sacrificing a loved one. Romanoff sacrifices herself, allowing Barton to get the Stone. Rhodes and Nebula attempt to return to their own time, but Nebula is incapacitated when her cybernetic implants link with her past self, allowing 2014-Thanos to learn about his future self's success and the Avengers' attempt to undo it. 2014-Thanos captures Nebula and sends 2014-Nebula forward in time to prepare for his arrival.

Reuniting in the present, the Avengers place the Stones in a gauntlet that Stark, Banner, and Rocket have built. Banner, who has the most resistance to radiation, uses the gauntlet to undo Thanos's disintegrations. Meanwhile, 2014-Nebula, impersonating her future self, uses the time machine to transport 2014-Thanos and his warship to the present, where he destroys the Avengers Compound. Present-day Nebula convinces 2014-Gamora to betray Thanos, but is unable to convince 2014-Nebula and kills her. Thanos overpowers Stark, Thor, and a Mjolnir-wielding Rogers. He summons his army to retrieve the Stones, intent on using them to destroy the universe and create a new one. A restored Stephen Strange arrives with other sorcerers, the restored Avengers, the Guardians of the Galaxy, the Ravagers, and the armies of Wakanda and Asgard to fight Thanos's army. (Note: For further coverage of this scene, see Avengers assemble scene) Danvers also arrives and destroys Thanos's warship, but Thanos overpowers her and seizes the gauntlet. Stark steals the Stones and uses them to disintegrate Thanos and his army, sacrificing himself.

After Stark's funeral, Thor appoints Valkyrie as the new king of New Asgard and joins the Guardians. Rogers returns the Stones and Mjolnir to their proper timelines and remains in the past to live with Carter. In the present, an elderly Rogers passes his shield to Sam Wilson.

== Cast ==
- Robert Downey Jr. as Tony Stark / Iron Man:
  The benefactor of the Avengers who describes himself as a "genius, billionaire, playboy, and philanthropist" with electromechanical suits of armor he made. According to directors Joe and Anthony Russo, Downey was the only actor to receive the entire screenplay for the film. Screenwriters Christopher Markus and Stephen McFeely knew that Stark's death was inevitable as a "[move] to selflessness" and as an end to the "chapter" Stark began. They felt that his death was earned after granting him "the perfect retirement life ... That's the life he's been striving for [...] They got married, they had a kid, it was great. It's a good death. It doesn't feel like a tragedy. It feels like a heroic, finished life." Joe Russo said that Stark "always knew he was going to die because he could never reconcile that notion in himself of not protecting the universe," and was the most defiant of the Avengers: "Stark is the most formidable of all of them [...] because of his heart." The Russos sought Downey's approval for Stark's arc, which they had developed since Captain America: Civil War (2016).
- Chris Evans as Steve Rogers / Captain America:
  The leader of the Avengers, World War II veteran and former fugitive, he was enhanced to the peak of human physicality by an experimental serum and frozen in suspended animation before waking up in the modern world. Markus described Rogers as someone who is "moving toward some sort of enlightened self-interest". McFeely knew that Rogers "was going to get his dance" that he promised Peggy Carter in Captain America: The First Avenger (2011). He initially planned to complete Rogers's story arc by killing him off, given the character's long life for his occupation, before deciding to have Rogers bequeath his shield to Sam Wilson. Patrick Gorman provided an on-set reference for an elderly Steve Rogers.
- Mark Ruffalo as Bruce Banner / Hulk:
  An Avenger and genius scientist who, because of exposure to gamma radiation, transforms into a monster when enraged or agitated. Banner balances his two sides with gamma experimentation in this film, enabling him to combine his intelligence with the Hulk's strength and physical stature based on his "Professor Hulk" comic-book identity. Compared to other heroes who were demotivated by their loss to Thanos, Banner is the only character to remain hopeful; according to Anthony Russo, "Banner is the sole character who is actually forging into a bright new future, trying to build something totally new and find something completely new [...] Banner is the one who is most heroic in a sense that he maintains his will to keep trying." This concludes a character arc that was established in Thor: Ragnarok (2017) and continued in Avengers: Infinity War (2018).
- Chris Hemsworth as Thor:
  An Avenger and the king of Asgard, based on the Norse mythological deity of the same name. Thor now wields a mystical axe known as Stormbreaker after the destruction of his hammer, Mjolnir, in Thor: Ragnarok. In the film, Thor has become an overweight, drunken ruler of Asgard's refugees in Tønsberg, Norway. Hemsworth said about this drastic character change, "I just had an opinion. I wanted to do something different this time. Each film I've wanted to, in particular, the last couple, and they were on board," and added, "We shot for many hours and days and discussed how far could we push (Thor) and what we could do different." According to Anthony Russo, "Even though there's a lot of fun to be had in the movie with his physical condition, it's not a gag. It's a manifestation of where he is on a character level, and we think it's one of the most relatable aspects of him. I mean, it's a very common sort of response to depression and pain." Thor's story was Russo's favorite arc: "Part of Chris' magic as a comedic actor is his dedication to the depth of the character on a very earnest level [...] It's so devious and subversive when comedy is coming from a place of complete commitment and emotional complexity." Hemsworth underwent around three hours of hair and makeup work for the transformation, which also required him to wear a large silicone prosthetic suit; he called himself "Lebowski Thor" on set. Thor was initially supposed to revert to his "old chiseled self" in the middle of Endgame, but Hemsworth wanted to retain Thor's new physique.
- Scarlett Johansson as Natasha Romanoff / Black Widow:
  An Avenger and a highly trained spy and former agent of S.H.I.E.L.D. Romanoff continues to command several teams from around the galaxy in the Avengers headquarters at the beginning of the film, which Joe Russo said stemmed from her inability to move on from their failure to stop Thanos: "[S]he's doing everything she can to try and hold the community together [...] She's the watcher on the wall still." On the decision for Romanoff to sacrifice herself for Barton to acquire the Soul Stone to bring everyone back, Joe Russo said that it was part of a larger theme of the desire to sacrifice or protect in Infinity War: "When she gets to that [Soul Stone] scene, I think she understands that the only way to bring the community back is for her to sacrifice herself." McFeely said, "Her journey, in our minds, had come to an end if she could get the Avengers back. She comes from such an abusive, terrible, mind-control background, so when she gets to Vormir and she has a chance to get the family back, that's a thing she would trade for." To prepare for the film, Johansson adopted an intense workout regimen which included plyometrics, Olympic weightlifting and gymnastics and a time-restricted diet. All were supervised by her longtime trainer, Eric Johnson, with whom she had worked since Iron Man 2 (2010) – the film which introduced her character.
- Jeremy Renner as Clint Barton / Hawkeye:
  A master archer and a former Avenger and agent of S.H.I.E.L.D. who was recently under house arrest. McFeely described Barton's dark turn as "a good example of people who had much stronger stories after the Snap". The film's cold open, with the disintegration of Barton's family, was initially supposed to be in Infinity War after Thanos snapped; it was moved to Endgame, however, with Markus saying that it was "going to blunt the brutality of what [Thanos] did." Joe Russo called it "a very tragic scene to open the movie with. It's one of the few scenes in the movie that actually makes me tear up when I watch it, because I think about my own family [...] And then you think about what would happen to you, as a father. You'd become very self-destructive."
- Don Cheadle as James "Rhodey" Rhodes / War Machine:
  An officer in the U.S. Air Force and an Avenger who operates the War Machine armor. Cheadle described Rhodes's newfound belonging as an Avenger as "not so much straddling one foot in the military. He's much more on the side of The Avengers than he was prior." This is reflected on Rhodes's more instinctive and realistic worldview in the midst of encountering the fantastic; according to Cheadle, "He's definitely got some 'what-the-eff-is-happening' [attitude,] more than maybe the rest of them do, given his background. But it's a trial by fire, and he's quickly adapted to what [the threat] is, rather than what he wishes it were."
- Paul Rudd as Scott Lang / Ant-Man:
  A former petty criminal and Avenger who acquired a suit that allows him to shrink or grow in size while also increasing in strength. Lang is portrayed by twins Bazlo and Loen LeClair as a baby, by Jackson A. Dunn at age 12, and by Lee Moore at age 93. This was Moore's final film before his death in August 2018. Markus explained that adding Lang helped with implementing time travel into the film, saying, "we had access to him in the second movie, and the fact that he was bringing a whole subset of technology that did have something to do with a different concept of time was like a birthday present."
- Brie Larson as Carol Danvers / Captain Marvel:
  An ex-U.S. Air Force fighter pilot and Avenger whose DNA was altered during an accident, giving her superhuman strength, energy projection, and flight. Markus said that Danvers's powers are on a scale that has not previously existed in the MCU and compared her personality to Rogers's, "which is sort of a person who's right and knows they're right and doesn't really want to hear it when you tell them they're wrong". Danvers has little screen time in the film, which McFeely said was "not the story we're trying to tell—it's the original Avengers dealing with loss and coming to a conclusion, and she's the new, fresh blood." Larson filmed her scenes for Endgame before beginning work on her solo film, Captain Marvel (2019), which was released first. Captain Marvel directors Anna Boden and Ryan Fleck were present for the filming of her scenes in Endgame, and gave Danvers's characterization in the film their blessing.
- Karen Gillan as Nebula:
  An adopted daughter of Thanos and an Avenger who was raised with Gamora. After being an antagonist or an anti-hero in previous MCU films, Nebula undergoes a redemption arc and makes amends for her past actions (including an encounter with a past version of herself); according to Gillan, she is "staring her former self in the face and it's really clear how far she's come from that angry, bitter and twisted person. She's starting to connect with other people and find some level of forgiveness." Gillan guessed that Nebula would play a prominent role in the film when she realized that Infinity War and Endgame would be adapted from The Infinity Gauntlet, which she had read when she was initially cast as Nebula in Guardians of the Galaxy (2014). Gillan shared several scenes, most of which were improvised, with Downey in the film's opening.
- Danai Gurira as Okoye: The general of the Dora Milaje, a group of elite women warriors.
- Benedict Wong as Wong: A Master of the Mystic Arts and a companion of Doctor Strange.
- Jon Favreau as Happy Hogan: The former head of security at Stark Industries and Stark's friend and former driver.
- Bradley Cooper as Rocket:
  A member of the Guardians and an Avenger who is a genetically engineered, raccoon-based bounty hunter, mercenary, and master of weapons and battle tactics. Sean Gunn was again the stand-in for Rocket during filming, with his acting and expressions the character's motion reference. Rocket's appearance continues a story arc that was established by Guardians of the Galaxy writer-director and Endgame executive producer James Gunn in the first two Guardians of the Galaxy films, was continued in Infinity War and Endgame, and concluded in Guardians of the Galaxy Vol. 3 (2023).
- Gwyneth Paltrow as Pepper Potts:
  Stark's wife and the CEO of Stark Industries. Potts wears a weaponized powered exosuit of armor made for her by Stark, based on the Rescue armor. Paltrow said this would be her final major appearance in the MCU.
- Josh Brolin as Thanos:
  An intergalactic warlord from Titan who acquired all six Infinity Stones in Infinity War and triggered the Snap, killing half of all life in the universe. Joe Russo said that after Thanos succeeded, he was "done" and "retired". Markus and McFeely had difficulty in factoring the older, post-Infinity War Thanos into the film (because the character already had the Infinity Stones) until executive producer Trinh Tran suggested that they kill Thanos in the film's first act. Markus said that the character's early death improved his agenda. Thanos has less screen time in Endgame than in Infinity War, where he was considered the main character. According to McFeely, "We had to give ourselves permission to backseat the villain a little bit. I don't think anyone in the first half of the movie is going, 'Oh I wish there was a villain'. You're rolling around in the loss and the time heist, and you think it's sort of Avengers against nature." The younger version of Thanos was nicknamed "Warrior Thanos" by the filmmakers. In addition to voicing the character, Brolin did the motion capture. Joe Russo was a stand-in for Thanos for some scenes with Nebula.

Several actors from Infinity War reprise their roles in Endgame, including Benedict Cumberbatch as Dr. Stephen Strange, Chadwick Boseman as T'Challa / Black Panther, Tom Holland as Peter Parker / Spider-Man, Zoe Saldaña as Gamora, Elizabeth Olsen as Wanda Maximoff, Anthony Mackie as Sam Wilson / Falcon, Sebastian Stan as Bucky Barnes / Winter Soldier, Tom Hiddleston as Loki, Pom Klementieff as Mantis, Dave Bautista as Drax the Destroyer, Letitia Wright as Shuri, William Hurt as Thaddeus Ross, Cobie Smulders as Maria Hill, Winston Duke as M'Baku, Tom Vaughan-Lawlor as Ebony Maw, Jacob Batalon as Ned, Vin Diesel as Groot, Chris Pratt as Peter Quill / Star-Lord, Samuel L. Jackson as Nick Fury, Ross Marquand as Red Skull / Stonekeeper, Michael James Shaw as Corvus Glaive, Terry Notary as Cull Obsidian, and Kerry Condon as the voice of Stark's suit AI F.R.I.D.A.Y. Monique Ganderton again provided motion capture for Proxima Midnight.

Also reprising their roles from previous MCU films were Evangeline Lilly as Hope van Dyne / Wasp, Tessa Thompson as Valkyrie, Rene Russo as Frigga, John Slattery as Howard Stark, Tilda Swinton as the Ancient One, Hayley Atwell as Peggy Carter, Marisa Tomei as May Parker, Taika Waititi as Korg, Angela Bassett as Ramonda, Michael Douglas as Hank Pym, Michelle Pfeiffer as Janet van Dyne, Linda Cardellini as Laura Barton, Maximiliano Hernández as Jasper Sitwell, Frank Grillo as Brock Rumlow, Robert Redford as Alexander Pierce, Callan Mulvey as Jack Rollins, and Ty Simpkins as Harley Keener. Sean Gunn reprised his role as Kraglin and was credited for the role, although he is not clearly visible in the film. Natalie Portman appears as Jane Foster in footage from a deleted Thor: The Dark World (2013) scene and a voiceover when Foster is talking in the distance. James D'Arcy reprised his role as Edwin Jarvis from the MCU television series Agent Carter, the first time a character introduced in an MCU television series appeared in an MCU film.

Hiroyuki Sanada played Akihiko, a Yakuza boss in Tokyo who opposes Barton. Lexi Rabe played Morgan Stark, Tony and Pepper's daughter. Katherine Langford was cast as an older Morgan, but her scene was cut from the final film. Emma Fuhrmann played an older Cassie Lang, Scott's daughter, after the character was played as a child by Abby Ryder Fortson in previous MCU films. Avengers co-creator Stan Lee had a posthumous cameo in the film, digitally de-aged as a car driver in 1970, in his final film appearance. Ken Jeong and Yvette Nicole Brown had cameo appearances as a storage facility guard and a S.H.I.E.L.D. employee, respectively. Co-director Joe Russo (credited as Gozie Agbo) had a cameo appearance as a grieving gay man, the first appearance of an openly homosexual character in an MCU film. Joe's daughters Ava and Lia Russo played Barton's daughter Lila and a fan of Hulk, respectively. Thanos creator Jim Starlin also appeared as a grieving man. The character Howard the Duck appeared in a non-speaking cameo.

== Production ==
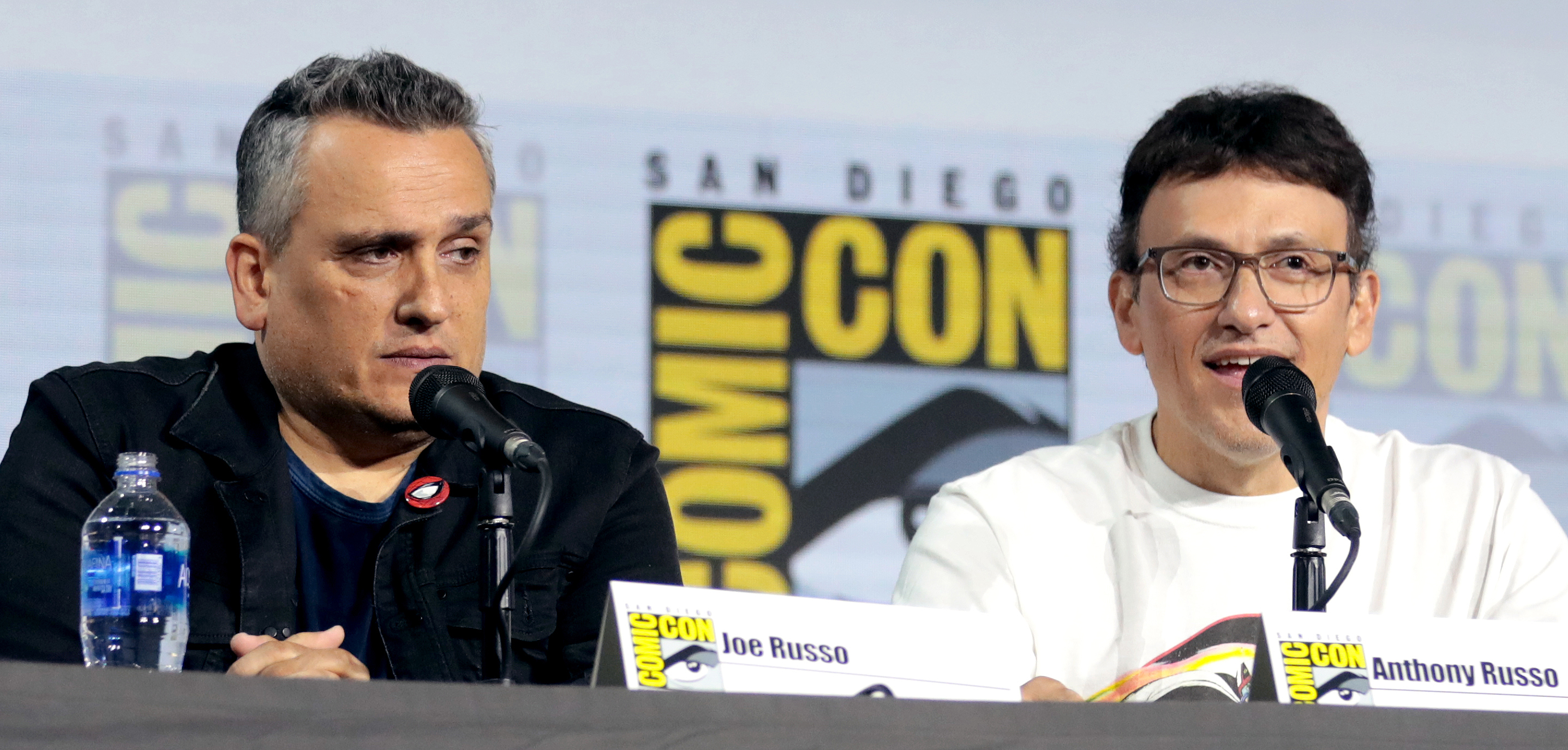
Joe and Anthony Russo, the film's directors

In October 2014, Marvel Studios announced a two-part sequel of Avengers: Age of Ultron (2015) entitled Avengers: Infinity War. Part 1 was scheduled to be released on May 4, 2018, and Part 2 was scheduled for May 3, 2019. Marvel's plan was to film both parts of Infinity War back-to-back. Anthony and Joe Russo were hired to direct the films in April 2015. The next month, Christopher Markus and Stephen McFeely signed on to write the screenplays for both parts of the film. Producer Kevin Feige said they would be "two distinct" projects with shared elements, not one story split across two films. The Russos decided to rename them to remove this misconception in May 2016, and Marvel left the second film untitled that July. Feige and the Russo brothers indicated that the title was being withheld to avoid giving away plot details.

Principal photography began on August 10, 2017, under the working title Mary Lou 2 at Pinewood Atlanta Studios in Fayette County, Georgia, with Trent Opaloch the director of photography. The film and Infinity War were shot with ARRI Alexa IMAX 2D cameras, the first time a Hollywood feature film was shot entirely with IMAX digital cameras. Filming was done that month in the Gulch area of downtown Atlanta, near the Five Points MARTA station, and in Piedmont Park. Feige said that the films were originally scheduled to be filmed simultaneously but were ultimately shot back-to-back: "It became too complicated to cross-board them like that, and we found ourselves—again, something would always pay the price. We wanted to be able to focus and shoot one movie and then focus and shoot another movie." Anthony Russo originally felt that it made more sense to shoot the films simultaneously for financial and logistical reasons (including the large number of cast members), and had suggested that "some days we'll be shooting the first movie and some days we'll be shooting the second movie. Just jumping back and forth." The 2013 Asgard scenes were shot at Durham Cathedral in Durham, England during production of Infinity War in early May 2017. Production wrapped on January 11, 2018, although additional filming took place in New York's Dutchess and Ulster counties in June 2018. Re-shoots began by September 7, 2018, and ended on October 12. More re-shoots were done in January 2019. Location shooting also took place in St Abbs, Scotland, which doubled for New Asgard in Norway. Evans and Hemsworth earned $15 million each for the film.

The film's official title, Avengers: Endgame, and final U.S. release date of April 26, 2019, were revealed with the film's first trailer in December 2018. Visual effects for the film were created by Industrial Light & Magic, Weta Digital, DNEG, Framestore, Cinesite, Digital Domain, Rise, Lola VFX, Cantina Creative, Capital T, Technicolor VFX, and Territory Studio. Like previous MCU films, Lola worked on the de-aging scenes; the film has 200 de-aging and aging shots. Downey, Evans, Ruffalo, Hemsworth, Johansson, and Renner were de-aged to their 2012 appearances for scenes recreated from The Avengers (2012). Michael Douglas, John Slattery, and Stan Lee were also de-aged for the 1970 New Jersey scene, and Douglas's appearance in The Streets of San Francisco was referenced. Lola aged Evans for the final scene, where he is an elderly man, with makeup and a stand-in. Jeffrey Ford and Matthew Schmidt were the film's editors.

== Music ==
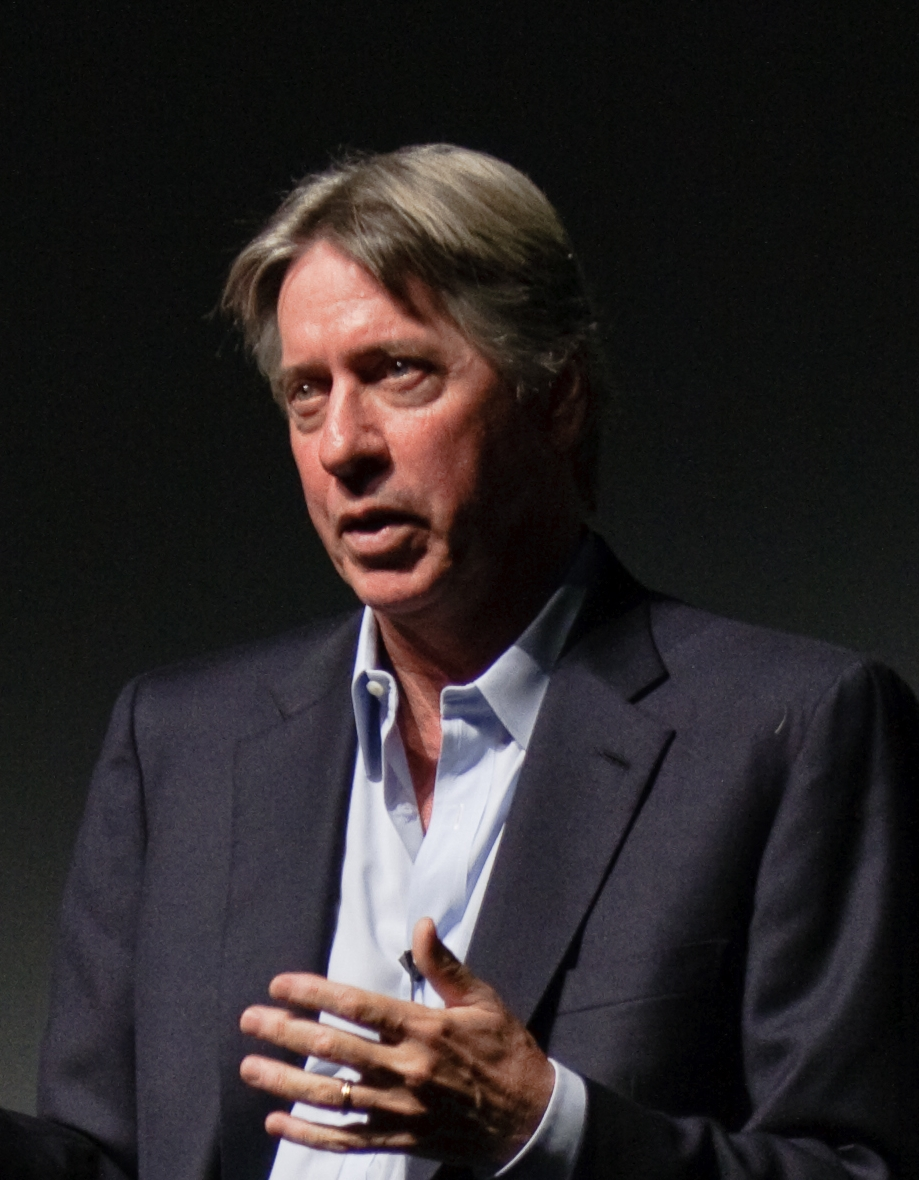
Alan Silvestri composed the film's score.

Alan Silvestri, who composed the score for The Avengers, was announced in June 2016 to be returning to score Infinity War and Endgame. The Russos began working with Silvestri on the Endgame score in early November 2018, and it was completed in late March 2019. A soundtrack album with Silvestri's score was released digitally by Hollywood Records on April 26, 2019, with a physical release on May 24. A video for the track "Portals", composed for the climactic "Avengers assemble" scene in which reinforcements arrive for the Avengers, was released on June 13.

Silvestri described the score as having the franchise's most versatile tone, ranging from "thunderous percussion and powerful brass" for the action scenes to minimalist, jazz-inspired music for Ant-Man and the Quantum Realm. He reprised his themes from the previous Avengers films and Captain America: The First Avenger, including material he wrote for Thanos and the Infinity Stones in Infinity War. Silvestri found writing the music to end Captain America's story poignant, since he had "been on this journey with him since the beginning". The film also used the Ant-Man (2015) theme by Christophe Beck, the Doctor Strange (2016) theme by Michael Giacchino, and the Captain Marvel theme by Pinar Toprak. The songs "Come and Get Your Love" by Redbone and "It's Been a Long, Long Time" by Jule Styne and Sammy Cahn were also used after previously being heard in Guardians of the Galaxy and Captain America: The Winter Soldier (2014), respectively.

== Marketing ==
The marketing campaign for Endgame cost over $200 million, the most for any Marvel Studios film. Promotional partners included Stand Up to Cancer, Mastercard, Ulta Beauty, the Audi e-tron GT concept car (which appears in the film), McDonald's, GEICO, Coca-Cola, Google, General Mills, Hertz, Ziploc, Oppo, and Synchrony Financial. A year before the film's release, Germain Lussier of io9 spoke on the approach Marvel might have to take in marketing the film, given the end of Infinity War where many established characters die. He questioned if those characters would appear on posters and in toy campaigns, and if the actors playing them would participate in press events leading up to the film's release. Lussier felt that Disney and Marvel could focus on the original Avengers team members (most of the living characters), but noted that it would be more beneficial to show the return of the dead characters; this would create a "mystery and curiosity about how they come back" and a "whole new level of interest" for the film "while having all the stars front and center". Feige said in June 2018 that the dead characters would not be featured in the film's marketing. He presented a behind-the-scenes video from the film at CineEurope, and said that its marketing campaign would begin at the end of 2018. In early December 2018, before the first trailer's release, Graeme McMillan of The Hollywood Reporter spoke about the "fevered anticipation" surrounding it and felt it "remarkable", mostly "fan-created, without [the] noticeable direction from Marvel or the filmmakers involved"; knowledge about the film, without promotion, was "a kind of brand awareness" that was unusual. McMillan urged Marvel not to release any trailers for the film, since "the advanced level of enthusiasm [...] [was] likely to build" before its release; a trailer would take away the "Schrödinger's cat-esque position", as it was "almost guaranteed" to disappoint fans.

The first trailer for the film was released on December 7, 2018. Dustin Sandoval, vice president of digital marketing for Marvel Studios, said that the marketing team decided to omit the "title or hashtag" for the film in its trailer posts, allowing fans to see the trailer without spoiling it by watching "at the end". Richard Newby, also of The Hollywood Reporter, felt that although little new material was revealed in the trailer, it offered a "somber glimpse of a universe made unrecognizable" and let the viewer consider "the ending of Avengers: Infinity War and our questions of loss". Newby noted that the trailer highlighted the characters' "humble beginnings" with its visual language, and left viewers with "just as many questions as we had before". Austen Goslin of Polygon said that the title references a line by Doctor Strange to Tony Stark in Infinity War and a line by Stark in Age of Ultron. Goslin said, "The scene surrounding this line in Age of Ultron is one of the most important ones in the movie. Things look dark, and the group of heroes face an enemy they don't think they can defeat." The Endgame trailer "mirrors this perfectly", and "shows us that the Avengers' two most prominent characters are who they've always been: Iron Man, a pessimist who keeps fighting no matter how hopeless things look, and Captain America, an optimist who believes that nothing is hopeless when the world's heroes fight together." The trailer was viewed 289 million times in its first 24 hours and was the most-viewed trailer in that time period, surpassing the record of Avengers: Infinity War (230 million views). It set a record for Twitter conversation for a film trailer in the first 24 hours, generating 549,000 mentions. By January 3, 2019, BoxOffice's "Trailer Impact" metric service indicated that 77 to 78 percent of people surveyed who viewed the Endgame trailer in the past three weeks had expressed interest in seeing the film. In the three weeks it was measured by the service, the trailer was number one for all and had the top two percent of respondents express interest in seeing the film since the service's introduction in March 2018.

The second trailer for the film and its theatrical release poster were released on March 14, 2019. All 13 actors on the poster received top billing except for Danai Gurira, whose name appeared in the poster's bottom billing block with Benedict Wong, Jon Favreau, and Gwyneth Paltrow (none of whom appeared on the poster). Despite this, her exclusion from the top billing prompted criticism from some fans. Petrana Radulovic of Polygon said that how an actor is credited on a poster "is a complex process" based on "dealing with agents, fees, and movie star demands". Marvel Studios released an updated poster later that day, with Gurira in the top billing. The second trailer was viewed 268 million times in the first 24 hours, becoming the second-most-viewed trailer in that time period (behind the first trailer).

== Release ==
=== Theatrical ===
Avengers: Endgame premiered at the Los Angeles Convention Center on April 22, 2019. Disney converted the convention center's Hall K for the premiere, working with Dolby and QSC Audio to install a 70-foot (21-metre) screen, Dolby Vision projectors, and a Dolby Atmos sound system. The convention center also held the red carpet arrival and after-party for the premiere. The film was released in Australia, China, and other parts of Asia and Europe on April 24, in the United Kingdom on April 25, in the United States and India on April 26, and in Russia on April 29, in IMAX and 3D. It was originally scheduled to be released in the U.S. on May 3. Radio Liberty alleged that the Russian government postponed the film's release in that country to promote Russian-produced films. Endgame is part of Phase Three of the MCU. Endgame was the first film to feature 4DX's "Signature Character Motions" unique to the ten lead characters.

Following the release of the second trailer for the MCU film Spider-Man: Far From Home (2019) on May 6, 2019, it was added to the end of Endgame screenings with a message before the film from Far From Home star Tom Holland telling the audience to stay until after the credits to see the trailer. In June, Feige announced that Endgame would be re-released in theaters with seven minutes of new post-credits footage, including a Stan Lee tribute, an unfinished deleted scene, and the opening scene of Far From Home. The re-release began on June 28, 2019, in 2,025 theaters in the U.S. and Canada, and also was available in 38 other markets.

==== Encore ====
Endgame was re-released in theaters a second time on September 25, 2026, under the title Avengers Endgame: Encore, in anticipation of the sequel Avengers: Doomsday being released in December 2026. The re-release features an introduction from Evans and Downey and new footage, amounting to two additional minutes. Joe Russo said the re-release was "critically important", believing it was "required viewing" to follow the story of Doomsday. The new footage acts as a narrative bridge between the two films, enhancing the story of Doomsday and showing a natural progression from Endgame. Encore received an IMAX release as well as Disney's Infinity Vision certification for premium large formats, informing audiences which theaters offer "the biggest, brightest, and most immersive cinematic experiences" and meet certain technical standards; these screenings feature an additional exclusive look at Doomsday, which adds three-to-four minutes to the runtime for a total of five-to-six additional minutes. Encore was released on Disney+ on November 13, 2026.

=== Home media ===
The film was released for digital download by Walt Disney Studios Home Entertainment on July 30, 2019, and on Ultra HD Blu-ray, Blu-ray, and DVD on August 13. Streaming became exclusive to Disney+ on November 12, 2019. The digital and Blu-ray releases include behind-the-scenes featurettes, audio commentary, deleted scenes, and a blooper reel. Despite being filmed with IMAX cameras and released in IMAX theaters in the 1.90:1 aspect ratio, the home-media release has the cropped 2.39:1 aspect-ratio version used for non-IMAX screenings. The IMAX Enhanced version of the film was made available on Disney+ on November 12, 2021. The film earned $107.8 million from DVD and Blu-ray sales in the U.S.

== Reception ==
=== Box office ===
Avengers: Endgame originally grossed $858.4 million in the United States and Canada and $1.941 billion in other territories for a worldwide total of $2.799 billion. It was the highest-grossing film of all time, until it was surpassed by Avatar (2009) due to the 2021 re-release in China, and was the second-highest-grossing film of all time in the United States and Canada. When adjusted for inflation, Gone with the Wind (1939) remains the highest-grossing film of all-time worldwide, while Avengers: Endgame is the fifth-highest-grossing film.

The film had a worldwide opening of $1.2 billion, the biggest of all time, and nearly double Infinity War's previous record of $640 million. It is the fastest film to reach the $1 billion and $1.5 billion marks, doing so in five and eight days, respectively. Deadline Hollywood estimated that the film would break even five days after release, "unheard of for a major studio tentpole during its opening weekend". The website calculated Avengers: Endgame's final net profit as $890 million, accounting for production budgets, marketing, talent participation, and other costs; box-office grosses and home-media revenue placed it first on its list of 2019's "Most Valuable Blockbusters".

On May 4, the film's global box-office earnings surpassed the theatrical run of Infinity War. It was the fastest film to gross $2 billion worldwide, reaching that threshold in 11 days; Avatar did so in 47 days. Avengers: Endgame was the fifth film to surpass this threshold (after Avatar, Titanic (1997), Star Wars: The Force Awakens (2015), and Infinity War), and reached the $2.5 billion mark in 20 days; Avatar did so in 72. Encore added an additional $142.9 million to its box office, bringing its gross to $898.5 million in the United States and Canada and $2.04 billion in other territories, for a worldwide total of $2.942 billion, making the film the highest-grossing film of all time once again, surpassing the $2.923 billion gross of Avatar.

==== Pre-sale records ====
Endgame was one of 2019's most anticipated films in late December 2018, ranked second by IMDb and first by Fandango and Atom Tickets. Due to high demand when pre-sale tickets became available in the U.S. on April 2, 2019, customers on Atom Tickets and Fandango experienced long wait times and system delays; AMC Theatres' website and app crashed for several hours. Fandango announced that day that the film was its top-selling pre-sale film for the first 24 hours, breaking Star Wars: The Force Awakens's record in six hours. Atom said that the film was the website's bestselling first-day film (outselling Aquaman (2018) by four times), and Regal Cinemas reported that Endgame had sold more tickets in its first eight hours than Infinity War did in its first week. The film grossed $120–140 million in pre-sales. Fandango announced the day before release that Endgame was its biggest pre-selling film of all time, surpassing The Force Awakens with over 8,000 sold-out showtimes across the US.

In India, the film sold one million tickets in one day for its English, Hindi, Tamil, and Telugu-language screenings; 18 tickets were sold every second. In China, pre-sale tickets became available on April 12; a record one million were sold in six hours, surpassing Infinity War's first-24-hours total in the first hour and earning $114.5 million (RMB 770 million) in pre-sales.

==== United States and Canada ====
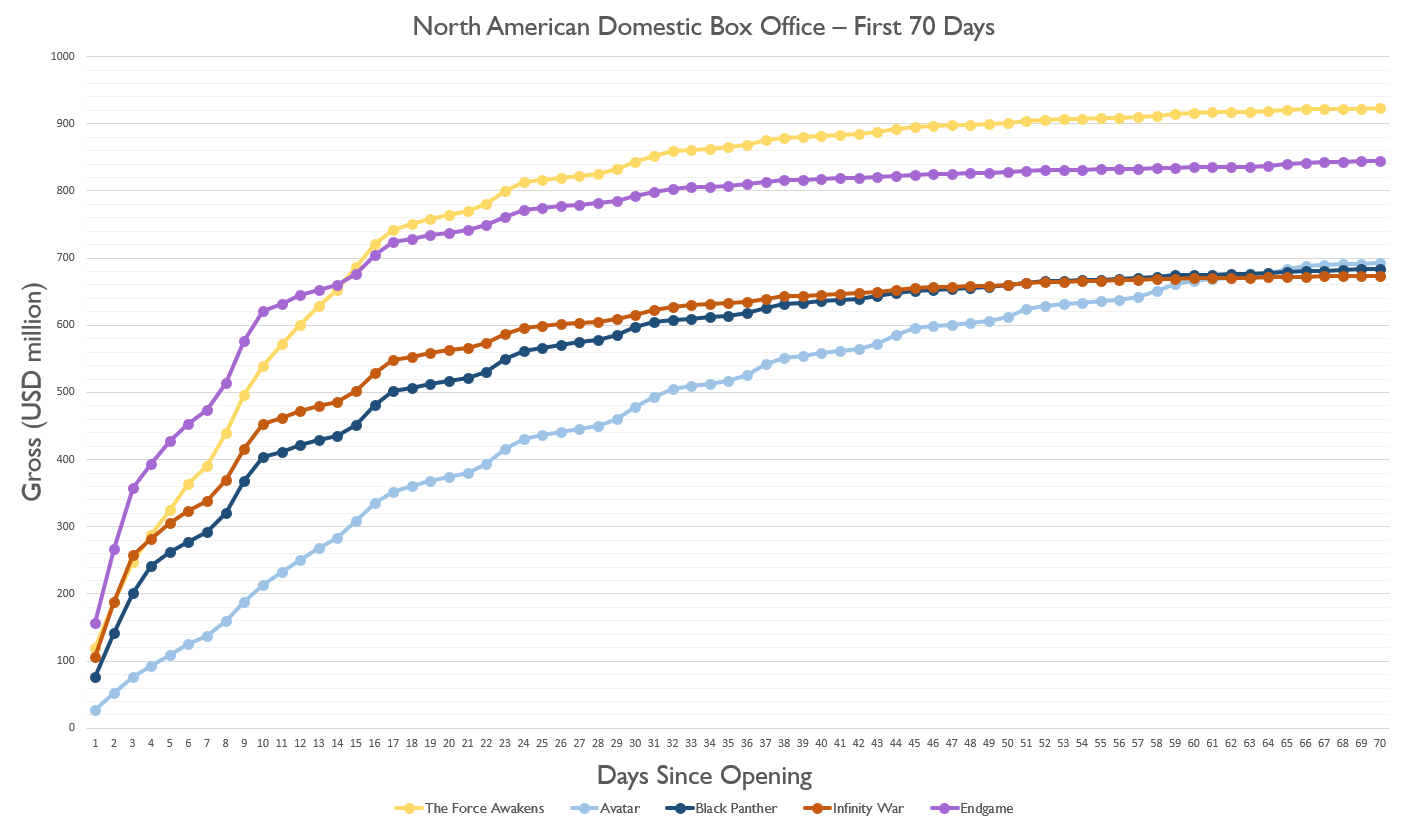
Chart of the North American box-office gross of Avengers: Endgame against the four highest-grossing films in the market

On April 4, industry tracking projected that the film would gross $200–250 million domestically during its opening weekend; some insiders saw those figures as conservative, and expected a $260–300 million debut. By the week of its release, domestic estimates had risen to $260–270 million, and some insiders suggested that a $300 million debut was possible. The film played in 4,662 theaters, 410 of which were in IMAX; it was the widest release ever, surpassing the record of Despicable Me 3's (2017) 4,529 theaters. Avengers: Endgame earned $357.1 million in its opening weekend, breaking Infinity War's record by nearly $100 million. It set records for Friday ($157.5 million, including $60 million from Thursday night previews), Saturday ($109.3 million), and Sunday ($90.4 million) totals, and had a higher total weekend gross than the previous box-office high of all films combined ($314 million). The film earned an average of $76,601 per theater, breaking records for highest per-theater average for a nationwide release ($59,982 for The Force Awakens) and the inflation-adjusted record held by Return of the Jedi (approximately $66,400, set in 1983). It earned $36.9 million the following Monday and $33.1 million on Tuesday, both the third-highest of all time. In its second weekend, the film made $147.4 million (the second-best second weekend ever) for a 10-day total of $621.3 million. It was the fastest film to pass the $600 million mark, ahead of The Force Awakens's 12 days and less than half the 26 days it took Infinity War. The film grossed $64.8 million the following week, the fourth-best third weekend ever. It passed the $700 million mark, tying The Force Awakens's record of 16 days. Endgame was finally dethroned in its fourth weekend by newcomer John Wick: Chapter 3 – Parabellum (2019). It earned $17.2 million the following weekend (a total of $22.3 million over the four-day Memorial Day weekend), crossing the $800 million threshold domestically. The film was re-released in its tenth weekend, earning $6.1 million, an increase of 207 percent from the previous weekend. It earned $1.2 million in its thirteenth weekend, breaking Avatar's all-time record.

Encore earned $3.8 million from previews, surpassing the $3.4 million from the 2025 re-release of Star Wars: Episode III – Revenge of the Sith (2005), and earned $26 million in its opening weekend, taking the top spot at the box office. It was the third-best opening for a re-release, after the $35.9 million for the 1997 re-release of Star Wars (1977) and the $30.2 million for the 2011 3D re-release of The Lion King (1994). IMAX and Infinity Vision screenings accounted for 60% of the weekend gross. Its second weekend saw a gross of $4.4 million, an 83% drop, which Deadline Hollywood reported was attributed to the film losing most of its Infinity Vision screens after the first week, and that the appeal for the re-release was "clearly very front-loaded".

==== Other territories ====
Endgame was projected to gross around $680 million internationally over its first five days, for a global debut of $850–950 million. The film was initially projected to gross $250–280 million in China in its opening weekend, but earned a record $107.5 million (RMB 719 million) in the country on its first day; this included $28.2 million (RMB 189 million) from midnight, 3 am and 6 am screenings, eclipsing The Fate of the Furious's (2017) record of $9.1 million. Due to the record-breaking first day and word of mouth (with a 9.1 on local review aggregator Douban and a 9.3 on ticket website Maoyan), debut projections were increased to over $300 million. The film made $169 million on its first day, the highest total of all time. Its largest markets after China were India ($9 million), South Korea ($8.4 million, the largest non-holiday single-day gross ever), Australia ($7.1 million), France ($6 million), and Italy ($5.8 million). The film over-performed, opening with $866 million overseas. Its largest markets, setting records for the best-ever opening in each country, were China ($330.5 million, RMB 2.22 billion), the United Kingdom ($53.8 million), South Korea ($47.4 million), Mexico ($33.1 million), Australia ($30.8 million), Brazil ($26 million), Spain ($13.3 million), Japan ($13 million), and Vietnam ($10 million). The film earned $21.6 million over its first four days in Russia after a government-caused delay of its premiere.

In its first week, the film's top five largest international markets were China ($459.4 million), the United Kingdom ($68.2 million), South Korea ($60.3 million), Mexico ($48.6 million), and India ($40.9 million). A week after its release, it became the highest-grossing foreign film of all time in China and India. The film's running total passed $1.569 billion from international markets in its second weekend, passing Titanic as the second-highest film overseas of all time. By January 2021, its top international markets were China ($632 million), the United Kingdom ($115 million), South Korea ($105 million), Brazil ($86 million), and Mexico ($78 million).

Encore earned $60 million its opening weekend internationally, the second-highest opening for a re-release behind the $67 million for the 2012 3D re-release of Titanic (1997). The re-release opened as the top film at the box-office in over 30 markets and the top non-local film in at least 7 markets, while Disney estimated that Encore was the highest opening weekend ever for a re-release in over 30 markets. China was its top grossing market with $21.3 million, with other notable markets including Mexico ($6.1 million) and Brazil ($3.1 million). Encore became the highest-grossing re-release across the Latin America region as well as Malaysia, India, and Indonesia.

=== Critical response ===
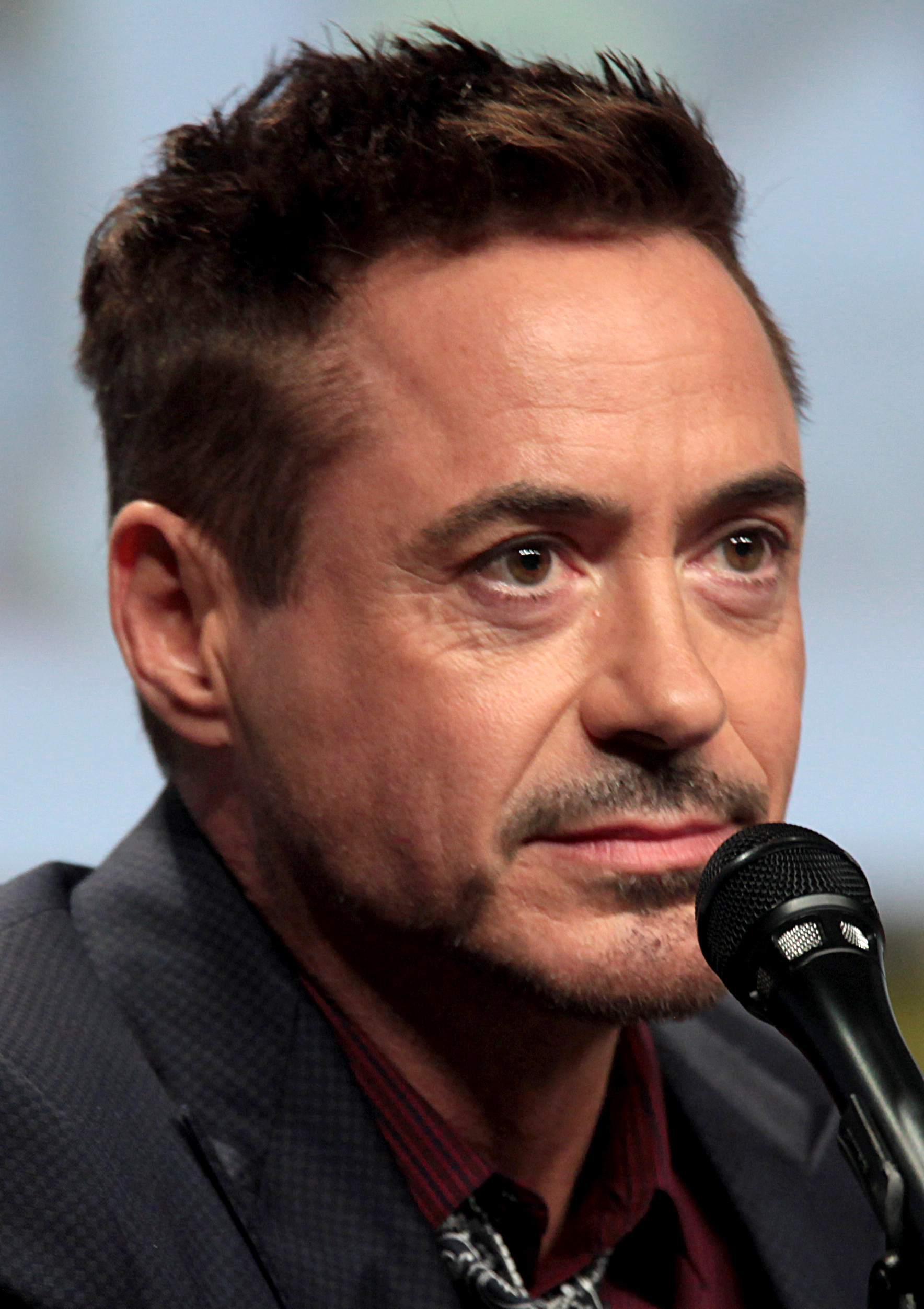
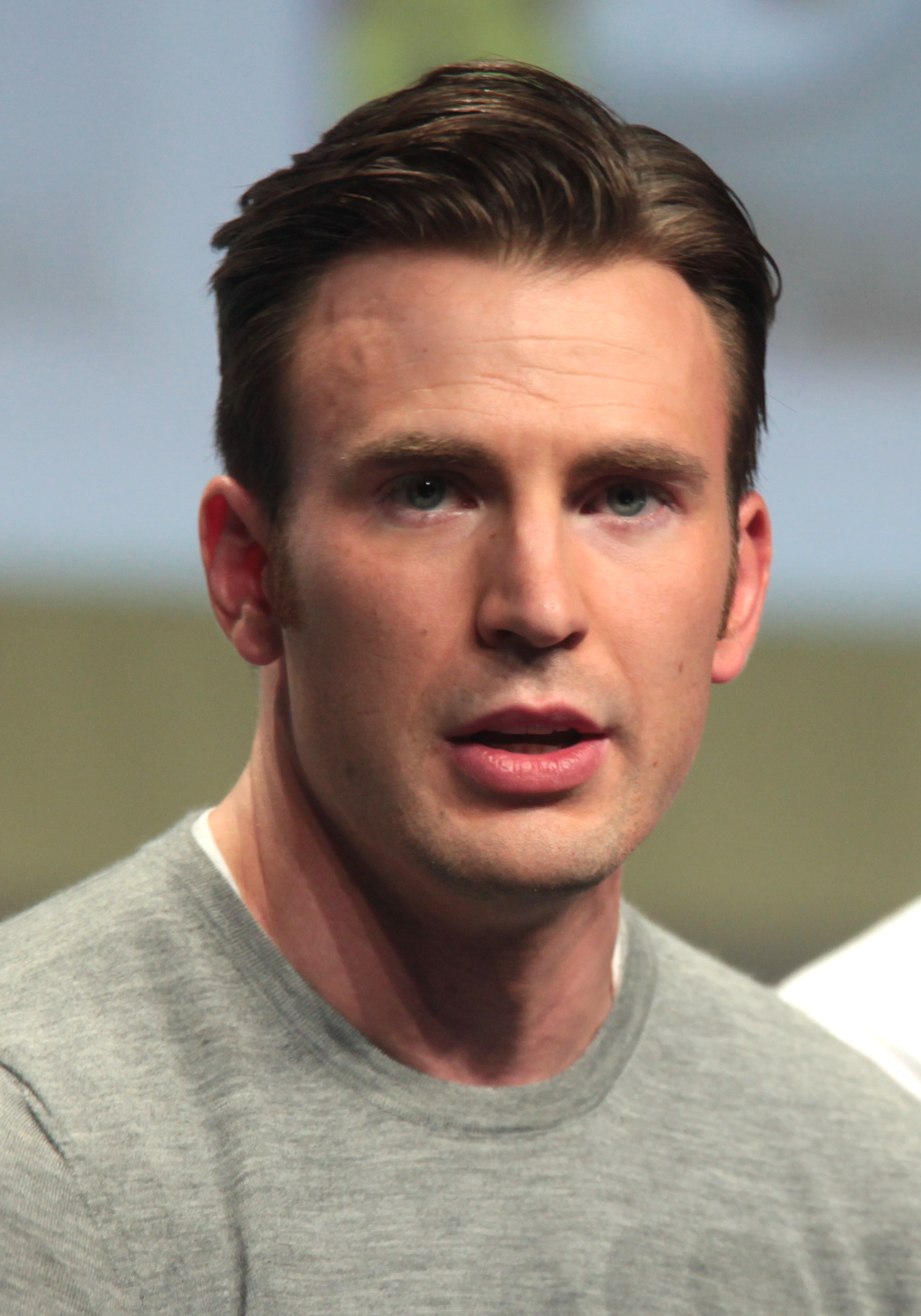
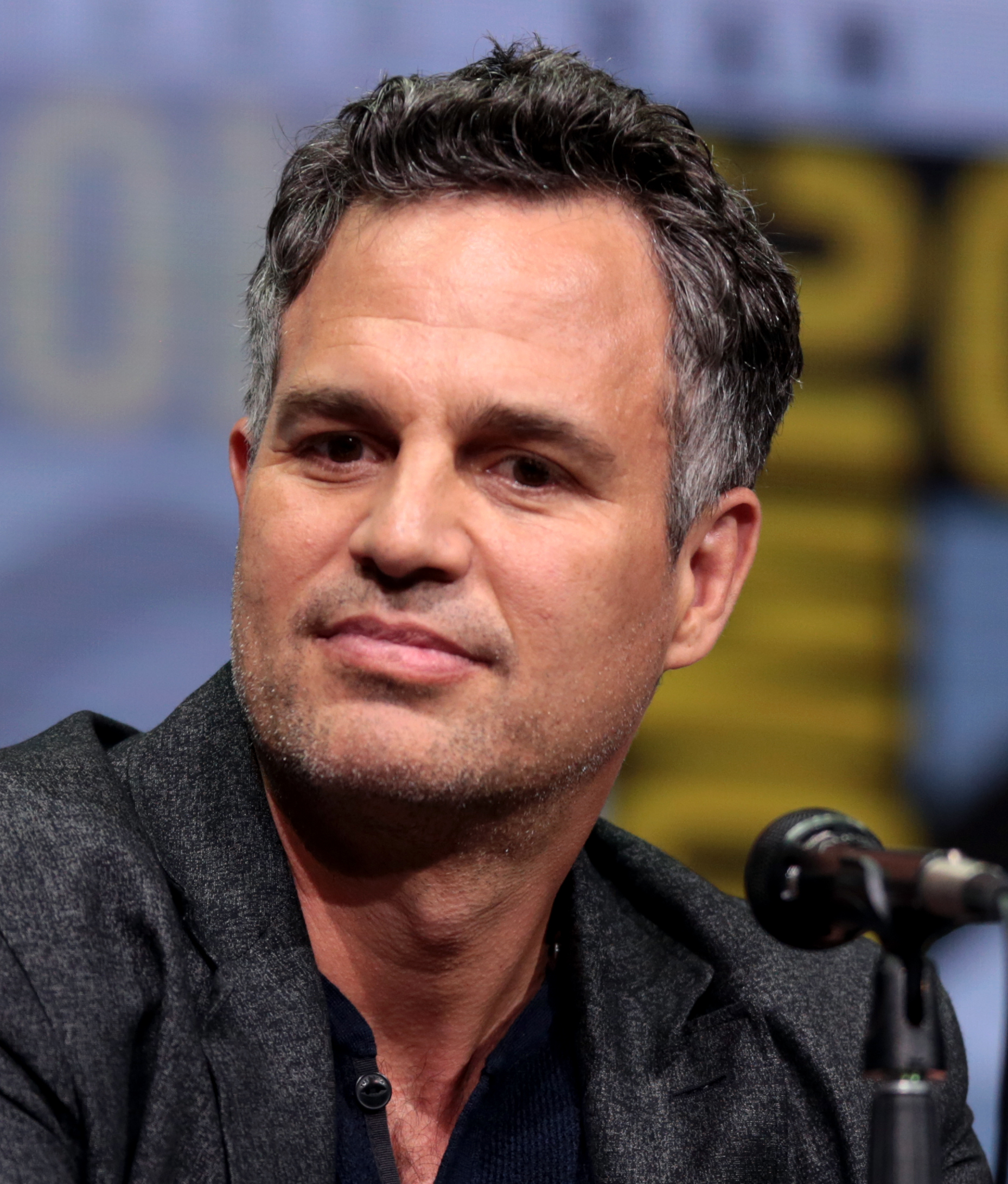
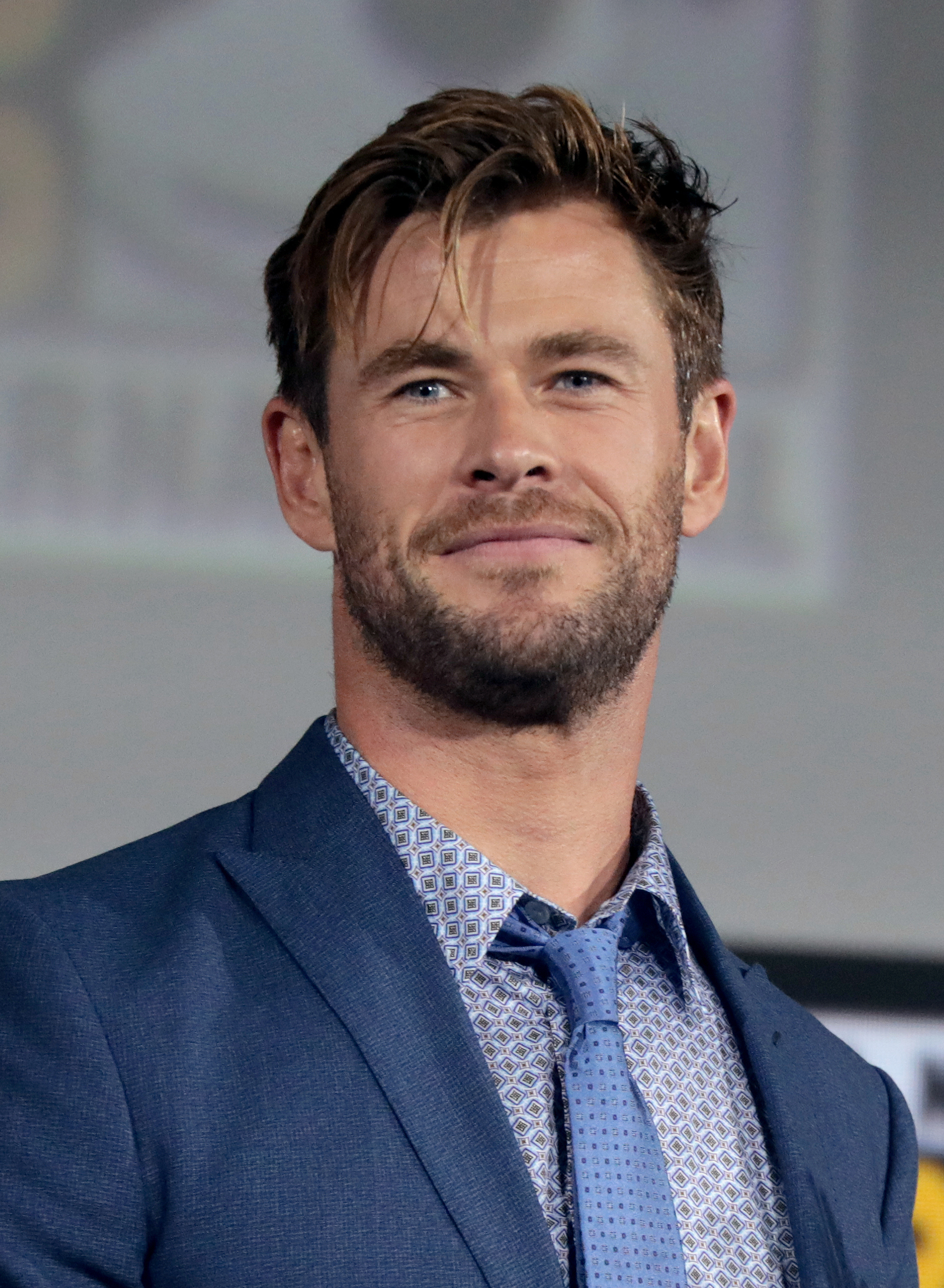
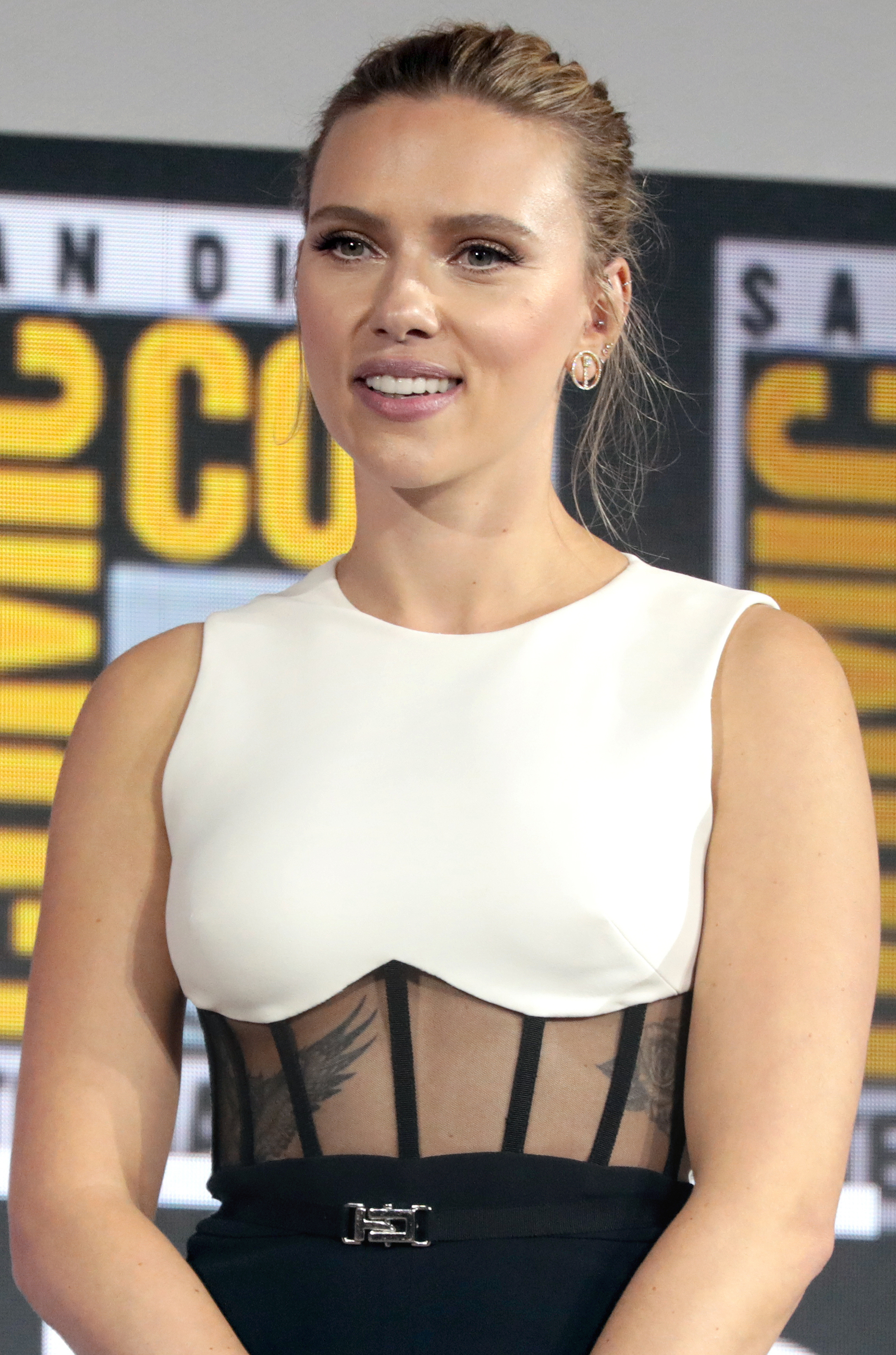
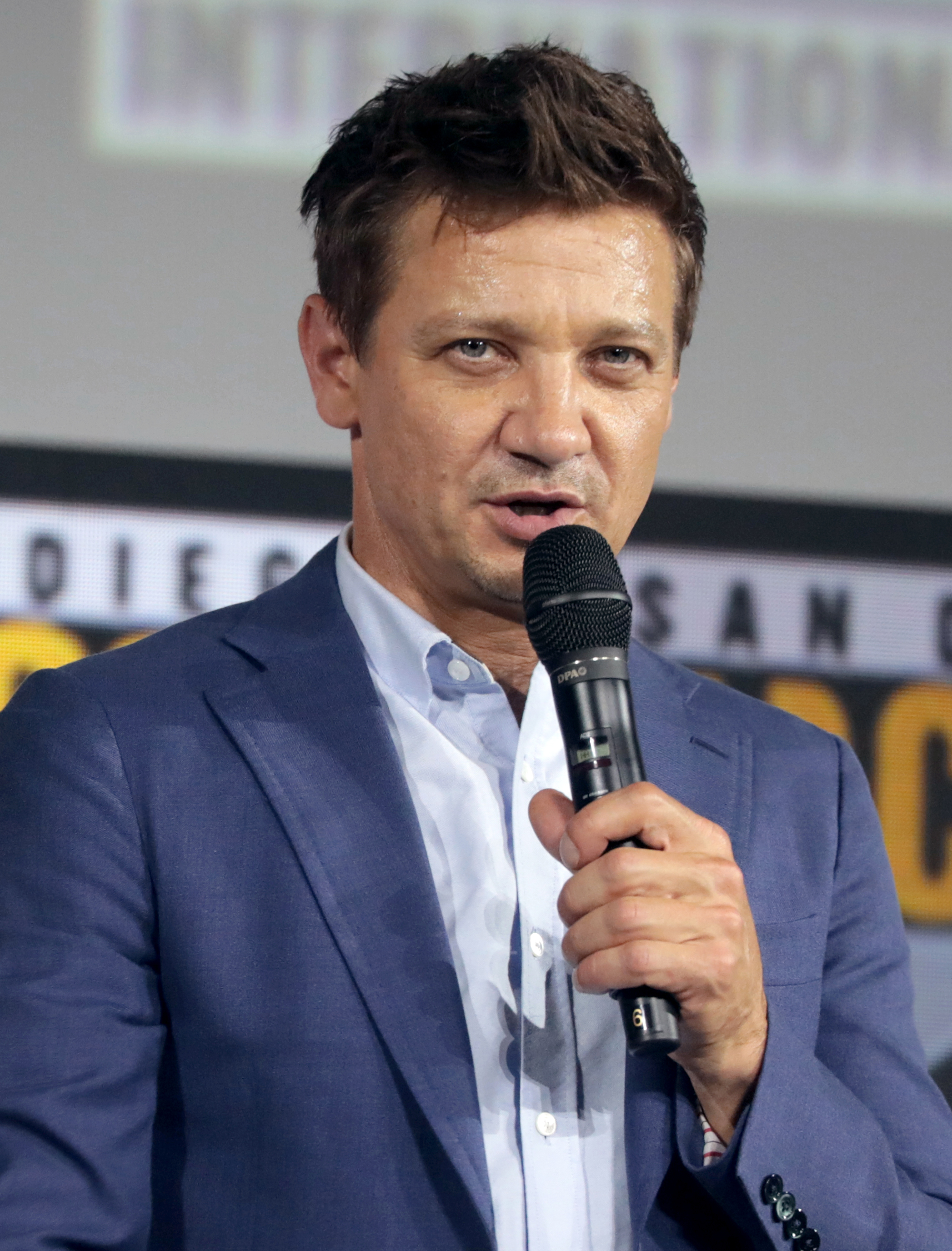
The performances of (top, L–R) Robert Downey Jr., Chris Evans, Mark Ruffalo, (bottom, L–R) Chris Hemsworth, Scarlett Johansson, and Jeremy Renner as the original six Avengers were widely praised by critics.

Review aggregator Rotten Tomatoes reported an approval rating of 94%, with an average score of 8.2/10 based on 551 reviews. The website's critical consensus reads, "Exciting, entertaining, and emotionally impactful, Avengers: Endgame does whatever it takes to deliver a satisfying finale to Marvel's epic Infinity Saga." Metacritic (which uses a weighted average) gave the film a score of 78 out of 100 based on 57 critics, indicating "generally favorable" reviews. Audiences polled by CinemaScore gave the film an "A+" grade on an A+ to F scale, the third Marvel film to receive the grade after The Avengers and Black Panther. PostTrak audiences gave the film five stars out of five and an 85% "definite recommend". Encore received a 91% positive score and an 81% "definite recommend" from PostTrak audiences.

Writing for NPR, Glen Weldon gave the film a positive review and found it a worthy sequel to its predecessor: "The Russos' decision to stick close to the experiences of the remaining Avengers proves a rewarding one, as they've expressly constructed the film as an extended victory lap for the Marvel Cinematic Universe writ large. Got a favorite character from any Marvel movie over the past decade, no matter how obscure? Prepare to get serviced, fan." In his Rolling Stone review, Peter Travers gave the film four stars out of five: "You don't have to make jokes about the clichéd time travel plot – the film is ready, willing and able to make its own, with Back to the Future coming in for a serious ribbing."

Peter Debruge of Variety wrote, "After the must-see showdown that was Infinity War, the Russo brothers deliver a more fan-facing three-hour follow-up, rewarding loyalty to Marvel Cinematic Universe." J. R. Kinnard of PopMatters wrote, "Big budget action filmmaking doesn't get much better than this." Todd McCarthy of The Hollywood Reporter said, "[W]hat comes across most strongly here, oddly enough for an effects-driven comic-book-derived film, is the character acting, especially from Downey, Ruffalo, Evans, Hemsworth, Brolin, and Paul Rudd". Richard Roeper, writing for the Chicago Sun-Times, gave the film four stars and praised its "emotional punch" and the "funny, well-paced, smart, expertly rendered screenplay by Christopher Markus and Stephen McFeely, crisp direction from Anthony Russo and Joe Russo, [...] and the universally stellar performances".

The New York Times reviewer A. O. Scott gave the film a positive-but-guarded review: "Endgame is a monument to adequacy, a fitting capstone to an enterprise that figured out how to be good enough for enough people enough of the time. Not that it's really over, of course: Disney and Marvel are still working out new wrinkles in the time-money continuum. But the Russos do provide the sense of an ending, a chance to appreciate what has been done before the timelines reset and we all get back to work." Justin Chang of the Los Angeles Times wrote that "Avengers: Endgame achieves and earns its climactic surge of feeling, even as it falls just short of real catharsis". Some called the film a notable improvement over its predecessor, Avengers: Infinity War, including Brian Tallerico of RogerEbert.com: Endgame is "a more patient, focused film [than Infinity War], even as its plot draws in elements of a dozen other movies." Matt Zoller Seitz, also of RogerEbert.com, compared the film positively to Infinity War, which he considered "too crowded, too rushed and yet too long". Seitz called Endgame "a heartfelt and satisfying experience" and a "surprisingly relaxed, character-driven, self-aware yet sincere comedy [for] two-thirds of [the film]. Much of the script suggests a laid-back Richard Linklater movie with superheroes". Joe Morgenstern of The Wall Street Journal cited Avengers: Endgame as the conclusion of the Infinity Saga, calling the final battle "inevitably unwieldy [...] but thrilling all the same, and followed by a delicate coda. So many stories. So many adventures. So much to sort out before the next cycle starts."

Richard Brody was more critical of the film in The New Yorker, saying that its good acting was not matched by comparable skill from its directors: "The Russos have peculiarly little sense of visual pleasure, little sense of beauty, little sense of metaphor, little aptitude for texture or composition; their spectacular conceit is purely one of scale, which is why their finest moments are quiet and dramatic ones". Anthony Lane of The New Yorker gave the film a negative review, finding it overwrought: "The one thing you do need to know about Avengers: Endgame is that it runs for a little over three hours, and that you can easily duck out during the middle hour, do some shopping, and slip back into your seat for the climax. You won't have missed a thing."

=== Accolades ===
At the 92nd Academy Awards, Avengers: Endgame received a nomination for Best Visual Effects. The film's other nominations include an Annie Award (which it won), a British Academy Film Award, and three Critics' Choice Movie Awards (winning two). Its Wikipedia page was the most-viewed article of 2019, with 44.2 million views. Endgame ranked 41st in a March 2020 Empire magazine poll of the 100 greatest films of the 21st century. The Avengers' assembling moment was one of five finalists for an Oscars Cheer Moment in the "Oscars Fan Favorite" contest for the 94th Academy Awards in February 2022, despite the film's ineligibility for other Academy Awards that year.

== Sequels ==
In May 2018, the Walt Disney Company CEO Bob Iger said Marvel Studios was focusing on new characters and franchises for the MCU following Endgame, but another Avengers film could happen eventually, given the popularity of the previous films. Shortly after the film's premiere, the Russo brothers said that they were not opposed to returning to the MCU in the future due to their positive relationship with Marvel Studios, but did not plan to do so at that time. Feige said in January 2021 that another Avengers film would happen eventually.

At the 2022 San Diego Comic-Con, Feige announced Avengers: The Kang Dynasty and Avengers: Secret Wars. The films would conclude Phase Six of the MCU. Feige later said that the Russos would not return to direct the films. Destin Daniel Cretton, who directed Shang-Chi and the Legend of the Ten Rings (2021), was set to direct The Kang Dynasty, with a script from Ant-Man and the Wasp: Quantumania (2023) writer Jeff Loveness. Loki season one (2021) head writer and Doctor Strange in the Multiverse of Madness (2022) writer Michael Waldron was set to write the screenplay for Secret Wars. By November 2023, Cretton had stepped down as director of The Kang Dynasty, when Waldron was hired to replace Loveness as the writer for the film. Jonathan Majors, who portrayed Kang the Conqueror and was expected to appear in both films, was fired by Disney and Marvel Studios in December 2023 after he was convicted of assault. By then, Marvel was referring to The Kang Dynasty internally as Avengers 5.

At the 2024 San Diego Comic-Con, the Russo brothers were announced to be directing the next two Avengers films. They revealed that Avengers 5 was now titled Avengers: Doomsday and would feature Doctor Doom as the main antagonist rather than Kang. Downey was revealed to have been cast as Doom for both films, and McFeely had joined as a co-writer. Frequent MCU film writers Chris McKenna and Erik Sommers also worked on the scripts for both films. Numerous MCU cast members reprise their roles in Doomsday, along with several actors who starred in 20th Century Fox's X-Men film series. Evans also reprises his role as Rogers, despite his "definitive ending" in Endgame, with the Russos calling him "the character that changed our lives... it was always going to come back" to his story. Feige described Doomsday as "picking up" where Endgame ended. Doomsday is scheduled to be released on December 18, 2026, with Secret Wars following on December 17, 2027.
