= Rich Raddon =

American entrepreneur

- Born: Northbrook, Illinois, U.S.
- Education: Brigham Young University
- Occupations: Entrepreneur, film producer
- Years active: 1993-present
- Relatives: Kaskade (Brother)

Rich Raddon is an American entrepreneur who sold his first venture MOVIECLIPS to Fandango, and works in the media technology space. Currently, Raddon is the co-founder and co-CEO of ZEFR, a company that provides technology solutions for content owners and brands on YouTube.

== Early life ==
Raddon grew up in Northbrook, Illinois and is a graduate of Brigham Young University, where he received his bachelor's degree in finance. Raddon began his career as an assistant to the late writer/director/producer John Hughes (filmmaker) in Chicago.

== Career ==
Raddon is an American entrepreneur and film producer. He is the Co-Founder and Co-CEO of ZEFR, a company that provides technology solutions for major content owners and brands on YouTube. Raddon is also responsible for leading overall strategy and operations as well as overseeing the content and distribution strategy, partnering with Hollywood studios and other media companies.

In December 2009, along with investment banker Zach James, Raddon co-founded MOVIECLIPS, a movie clips sharing Web startup company located in Santa Monica, CA. In April 2014, MovieClips sold to Fandango (ticket service).

Raddon's producing credits include five short films and movies as well as A Slipping-Down Life, Shooting Lily and The Making of '...and God Spoke.

Raddon served as the director of the Los Angeles Film Festival and as a media producer. He resigned his position with the LA Film Fest in November 2008 after it was disclosed that a donation was made, through the Church of Jesus Christ of Latter-day Saints, to pass Proposition 8, banning same-sex marriage in California.

== Personal life ==
Raddon resides in Pacific Palisades, Los Angeles, California with his wife and three children. Raddon is the brother of house DJ Ryan Raddon, better known as Kaskade.

== Filmography ==
Film credits
Year	Title	Role	Notes
1999	A Slipping-Down Life	Producer	
1998	A Hollow Place	Producer	Short Film
1996	Shooting Lily	Steven	Also producer
1996	The Woman in the Moon	Producer	
1993	The Making of '...And God Spoke'	Producer	
