= Welcome to Marwen (soundtrack) =

Welcome to Marwen (Original Motion Picture Soundtrack)

Film score by Alan Silvestri
- Released: December 21, 2018
- Recorded: 2018
- Genre: Film score
- Length: 57:22
- Label: Back Lot Music; Intrada
- Producer: Alan Silvestri; David Bifano

Alan Silvestri chronology
Avengers: Infinity War (2018)	Welcome to Marwen (2018)	Avengers: Endgame (2019)

Welcome to Marwen (Original Motion Picture Soundtrack) is the film score to the 2018 film Welcome to Marwen directed by Robert Zemeckis. Composed and conducted by Alan Silvestri, the soundtrack was released digitally through Back Lot Music on December 21, 2018, and in CDs and vinyl through Intrada Records.

== Background ==
Recurrent Zemeckis collaborator Alan Silvestri composed the film score. He worked on the score during late-July and early-November 2018. Silvestri's Back to the Future theme was referenced in one of the film's scenes.

== Reception ==
Pete Simons of Synchrotones wrote "[Silvestri] got a handful of recognisable themes and motifs that are repeated throughout the score – great for its structure and consistency. And it's a very accessible score." James Southall of Movie Wave wrote "Welcome to Marwen is more of a curio than those two [Ready Player One and Avengers: Infinity War] – an entertaining score, by far his most dynamic and memorable for Zemeckis in a number of years, but also a somewhat disjointed one (by design) which can make it a more uneven listen when it comes to the album." S. Rockwood of Set the Tape wrote "A workmanlike effort from Alan Silvestri, but he is capable of so much better." Keith Uhlich of The Hollywood Reporter called it an "extravagant score", while Vulture called it a "syrupy" score that blankets the film. Michael Gingold of Time Out called it "jaunty".

== Track listing ==
No.	Title	Length
1.	"Welcome to Marwen"	2:00
2.	"You Are Saved"	3:40
3.	"Finally Got It Right"	2:47
4.	"New Girl In Town"	1:34
5.	"Deja Spills Some Milk"	2:28
6.	"Magic"	2:30
7.	"You Got This"	1:15
8.	"Rise and Shine"	1:58
9.	"Saved"	2:20
10.	"Never Love You the Way I Do"	1:29
11.	"One Big Misunderstanding"	1:42
12.	"Goodnight Girls"	2:13
13.	"Hate Crime"	2:03
14.	"Beautiful Moon"	3:18
15.	"Crippled By Fear"	4:20
16.	"Hogie vs Meyer Part 1"	4:12
17.	"Hogie vs Meyer Part 2"	3:53
18.	"Wake Up Sweetheart"	1:17
19.	"They Can't Hurt Me"	1:05
20.	"Marwencol"	3:59
21.	"Welcome to Marwen End Credits"	7:19
Total length:		57:22

== Personnel ==
Credits adapted from liner notes:

- Music composer and conductor – Alan Silvestri
- Music producer – Alan Silvestri, David Bifano
- Electronic programming – Jonathan Bartz
- Orchestrator – Mark Graham
- Concertmaster – Belinda Broughton
- Digital recordist – Adam Olmsted
- Recording and mixing – Dennis Sands
- Mastering – Pat Sullivan
- Score editor – Jeff Carson
- Executive producer – Douglass Fake, Roger Feigelson
- Scoring production assistant – James Findlay
- Music coordinator – Frank K. DeWald
- Music preparation – Greg Jamrok, JoAnn Kane Music Service
- Design consultant – Joe Sikoryak
- Art direction – Kay Marshall
- Music business affairs for Universal Pictures – Tanya Perara
- Executive in charge of music for Universal Pictures – Mike Knobloch
- Marketing manager for Back Lot Music – Nikki Walsh
- Production manager for Back Lot Music – Regina Fake, Andy Kalyvas
- Music supervision for Universal Pictures – Rachel Levy

Instruments

- Bass – Chris Kollgaar, Dave Parmeter, Drew Dembowski, Geoff Osika, Mike Valerio, Oscar Hidalgo, Ed Meares
- Bassoon – Ken Munday, Rose Corrigan
- Cello – Cecilia Tsan, Charlie Tyler, Giovanna Clayton, Julie Jung, Mike Kaufman, Ross Gasworth, Steve Erdody, Tim Loo, Trevor Handy, Andrew Shulman
- Clarinet – Dan Higgins, Don Foster, Stuart Clark
- Flute – Heather Clark, Jenni Olson, Johanna Borenstein
- French horn – Allen Fogle, Dan Kelley, Dave Everson, Jenny Kim, Mark Adams, Dylan Hart
- Harp – Katie Kirkpatrick
- Oboe – Jessica Pearlman, Lara Wickes
- Percussion – Brian Kilgore, Dan Greco, Ted Atkatz, John Wakefield, Ken McGrath, M.B. Gordy,Wade Culbreath
- Piano, celesta – Randy Kerber
- Timpani – Greg Goodall
- Trombone – Bill Reichenbach, Phil Keen, Steve Holtman, Alex Iles
- Trumpet – Barry Perkins, Dan Rosenboom, Rob Schaer, Jon Lewis
- Tuba – Blake Cooper, Doug Tornquist
- Viola – Alma Fernandez, Andrew Duckles, Caroline Buckman, Carolyn Riley, Dave Walther, Erik Rynearson, Luke Maurer, Meredith Crawford, Rob Brophy, Shawn Mann, Brian Dembow
- Violin – Ben Powell, Ben Jacobson, Bruce Dukov, Charlie Bisharat, Grace Oh, Ina Veli, Jackie Brand, Jessica Guideri, Joel Pargman, Josefina Vergara, Julie Gigante, Katie Sloan, Luanne Homzy, Lucia Micarelli, Marisa Kuney, Natalie Leggett, Neel Hammond, Nina Evtuhov, Phil Levy, Roger Wilkie, Sara Parkins, Sarah Thornblade, Shalini Vijayan, Songa Lee, Tammy Hatwan, Tereza Stanislav, Alyssa Park

== Accolades ==
Award	Date of ceremony	Category	Recipient(s)	Result	Ref.
World Soundtrack Awards	October 18, 2019	Film Composer of the Year	Alan Silvestri (Note: also for Avengers: Endgame (2019))	Nominated	
