= Seen on the Screen with Jacqueline Coley =

Entertainment interview podcast

Seen on the Screen with Jacqueline Coley is an entertainment podcast series hosted by Jacqueline Coley, an editor at Rotten Tomatoes. The podcast premiered in April 2024 and is produced by Straw Hut Media in partnership with Universal Pictures and Rotten Tomatoes. In 2026, Fandango joined as a production partner for the third season.

== Background and format ==
The podcast features interviews with guests about their careers in the film and television industry. Earlier seasons focused on behind-the-scenes creatives who worked on Universal films. The 2026 season expanded the format to include on-screen talent and creatives.

== Episodes ==
Season	Episode	Title	Guest(s)	Release date
1	1	Storytelling Big and Small	Raheem Dawson	April 24, 2024
1	2	Bringing the Magic Home	Deva Renzi	May 8, 2024
1	3	Editors Have All the Fun	John Cantú	May 22, 2024
1	4	Discovering New Voices	Michelle Momplaisir	June 5, 2024
1	5	From Theater Kid to Chief Business Officer	Liz Jenkins	June 19, 2024
1	6	From Mariachi to Media Management	Mari Lozano	July 3, 2024
1	7	Crafting a Blockbuster Trailer	Patrick Starr	July 17, 2024
1	8	When Animation Meets Collaboration	Morenike Dosu	July 31, 2024
1	9	Making Music	Angela Leus	August 14, 2024
1	10	From Parks to Pictures	Arnold Klein	August 28, 2024
1	11	How Passion Powers Film Production	Ryan Jones	September 11, 2024
1	12	Bringing The Wild Robot to Life	Chris Sanders	September 25, 2024
1	13	Defying Gravity	Jon M. Chu	October 9, 2024
1	14	Opening the Aperture of Wicked	Alice Brooks	October 23, 2024
1	15	A Filmmaker Driven Focus	Peter Kujawski	November 13, 2024
1	16	The Power of Music in The Wild Robot	Kris Bowers	December 4, 2024
2	1	From TV Enthusiast to TV Trailblazer	Pearlena Igbokwe	January 15, 2025
2	2	The Art of Action	Ke Huy Quan	January 29, 2025
2	3	Taking Risks and Making Hits in Film Production	Matt Reilly	February 12, 2025
2	4	Taking Center Stage in the Digital Age	Nicole Schlegel	February 26, 2025
2	5	From Olympic Dreams to Marketing Themes	Jenny Storms	March 12, 2025
2	6	Cultivating the Next Generation	Priany Hadiatmodjo	March 26, 2025
2	7	Business Strategy to Scary Business	Abhijay Prakash	April 9, 2025
2	8	Movie Nights to Business Strategy Insights	Shivani Patel	April 23, 2025
2	9	Behind the Scenes at Focus Features	Angelea Vesagas	May 6, 2025
2	10	Spotlight on Behind-the-Scenes Content	Brett Levisohn	May 21, 2025
2	11	Reimagining an Animated Classic for Live Action	Dean DeBlois	June 4, 2025
2	12	Jurassic World Rebirth	Gareth Edwards	June 18, 2025
2	13	Building Universal Epic Universe	Brian Robinson	July 2, 2025
2	14	Sailing Into Danger	Manuel García-Rulfo	July 4, 2025
2	15	Inside Jurassic World Rebirth	Luna Blaise, David Iacono	July 9, 2025
2	16	Back in Disguise with The Bad Guys	Craig Robinson	July 16, 2025
2	17	Walking the Red Carpet, the Art of Premieres	Michelle Paris	July 30, 2025
2	18	From Punchlines to Punches	Bob Odenkirk	August 13, 2025
2	19	Talks Today Show, Dateline, and Family Movie Nights	Craig Melvin	August 27, 2025
2	20	The Horror of HIM	Justin Tipping	September 10, 2025
2	21	Gabby's Dollhouse on the Big Screen	Laila Lockhart Kraner	September 17, 2025
2	22	Horror's Next Generation: The No Drama Filmmakers	The No Drama Filmmakers	September 24, 2025
2	23	From Telemundo Intern to NBC News Anchor	Tom Llamas	October 8, 2025
2	24	Black Phone 2 – Behind the Mask	Ethan Hawke	October 17, 2025
2	25	How Music Moves Movies	Mike Knobloch	November 5, 2025
2	26	The Audience Is Never Wrong	Kevin Goetz	November 12, 2025
2	27	Crafting On-Screen Magic	Marc Platt	November 19, 2025
2	28	Five Nights at Freddy's 2	Emma Tammi	November 26, 2025
2	29	Wicked Wardrobe Secrets	Paul Tazewell	December 3, 2025
2	30	Music, Memphis, and Making Song Sung Blue	Craig Brewer	December 17, 2025

== Distribution and partnership ==
Season 3 premiered on February 25, 2026, in partnership with Fandango.

== Awards and recognition ==
In 2025, the podcast won two Gold Signal Awards for Best Host and Best Host – Listener's Choice for Coley's interview with Wicked director Jon M. Chu.

The podcast also received a Bronze honor at the Shorty Awards and was named a finalist in an additional Shorty Awards category.

In the same year, Seen on the Screen with Jacqueline Coley was recognized as an honoree at the Webby Awards.
