= James Cline =

James Cline may refer to:

- James J. Cline, American football coach
- James Michael Cline, American financier and the founder of Fandango
