= Yanover =

Yanover is a surname. Notable people with the surname include:

- Jerry Yanover (1947–2009), US-born Canadian political advisor
- Paul Yanover (born c. 1967), Canadian business executive
