= Paul Yanover =

Canadian business executive

- Born: c. 1967 (age 58–59); Ontario, Canada
- Education: University of Western Ontario, University of Southern California

Paul Yanover (born c. 1967) is a Canadian business executive. He was the president of Fandango Media, an American ticketing company, from 2012 to 2022. Before Fandango, Yanover spent 16 years working for The Walt Disney Company.

== Early life and education ==
Paul Yanover grew up in Hamilton, Ontario, Canada. He received bachelor's degrees in computer science and economics from the University of Western Ontario, and an MS in computer science from the University of Southern California.

== Career ==
Yanover began his career at Walt Disney Feature Animation in 1991, where he developed software. He worked on several films, including Aladdin and Beauty and the Beast.

In 1999, Yanover left Disney and co-founded Ceiva Logic, a consumer electronics company. He returned to the Walt Disney Company three years later and worked on the Walt Disney Parks and Resorts Online team. In 2006, Yanover was named executive vice president and managing director of Disney Online. He left in December 2010, part of a leadership shakeup after John Pleasants and James Pitaro were named co-presidents of Disney Interactive.

In October 2012, Yanover was named president of Fandango, a ticketing company founded in 2000. He expanded the company through acquisitions, including Movieclips in 2014 and Rotten Tomatoes, a media review site, in 2016. In 2018, Fandango expanded its international presence through deals with Cinepolis, Cinemark, National Amusements, and Cinemex, all based in Latin and Central American countries, becoming the largest online ticketer in all of Latin America. Yanover left Fandango in 2022.

In 2023, Yanover became the CEO of Lonely Planet.

== Personal life ==
Yanover is married with two daughters (born c. 2000), and lives in Laurel Canyon, Los Angeles.
