= A Slipping-Down Life =

- Theatrical poster
- Directed by: Toni Kalem
- Written by: Toni Kalem; Anne Tyler (novel)
- Produced by: Richard Raddon
- Starring: Lili Taylor; Guy Pearce
- Cinematography: Michael F. Barrow
- Edited by: Hughes Winborne
- Music by: Peter Himmelman
- Distributed by: Lions Gate Films
- Release dates: January 22, 1999 (Sundance); May 14, 2004 (US: limited)
- Running time: 111 minutes
- Country: United States
- Language: English
- Box office: $107,099

A Slipping-Down Life is a 1999 romantic drama film directed by Toni Kalem. Based on a novel by Anne Tyler, it stars Lili Taylor and Guy Pearce.

== Plot ==
Shy loner Evie (Taylor) hears musician Drumstrings Casey (Pearce) on the radio one night and becomes infatuated with him. She pursues him, carving his name (sadly, backwards) in her forehead with broken glass, and eventually they meet and then marry. They both still struggle to make something of their lives.

== Cast ==
- Lili Taylor as Evie Decker
- Guy Pearce as "Drumstrings" Casey
- Irma P. Hall as Clotelia
- John Hawkes as David Elliot
- Veronica Cartwright as Mrs. Casey
- Marshall Bell as Mr. Casey
- Johnny Goudie as Jesse
- Shawnee Smith as Faye-Jean Lindsay
- Sara Rue as Violet
- Bruno Kirby as Kiddie Arcades Manager
- Tom Bower as Mr. Decker
- Margaret Bowman as Mrs. Harrison
- Jo Ann Farabee as Woman At Salon
- Harv Morgan as Dick St. Clair
- Jason Russell Waller as Audience Member #1
- Lew Temple as Audience Member #2
- Jason Kavalewitz as Young Sexband

== Distribution ==
A Slipping-Down Life premiered on January 22, 1999, at the Sundance Film Festival, distributed by Lions Gate Entertainment. It was given limited theatrical release in the United States on May 14, 2004.

== Awards ==
The film was nominated for the Grand Jury Prize at the 1999 Sundance Festival. In 2004 it won the Special Jury Prize at the Indianapolis International Film Festival and Lili Taylor won the Achievement Award at the Newport Beach Film Festival. In that year it was also nominated for a Golden Trailer Award.
