= Avengers assemble scene =

Scene from the Marvel Cinematic Universe

The Avengers, led by Chris Evans as Steve Rogers, assembling in the battle at the Avengers Compound. Scenes from the sequence were positively received by cinematic audiences.

The "Avengers assemble" scene, also known as the portals scene, is the sequence leading to the climactic Battle of Earth in the superhero film Avengers: Endgame (2019), which sees the Avengers and their allies arrive on the battlefield through sling ring portals in preparation for a battle against the film's antagonist Thanos. It culminates with Steve Rogers / Captain America saying, "Avengers...assemble", the team's catchphrase and rallying cry in Marvel Comics. The scene features many cast members and characters who appeared in previous Marvel Cinematic Universe (MCU) installments, including several who had died in the preceding film Avengers: Infinity War (2018) during an event known as the Blip.

The catchphrase was not used in The Avengers (2012) because Marvel Studios president Kevin Feige felt it was not appropriate to include it, and the phrase was only half-uttered in Avengers: Age of Ultron (2015) because director Joss Whedon wanted to ensure that the film's scenes remained unaltered; this led to speculation that the MCU would never use the line. The "Avengers assemble" sequence was added to the Endgame script to satisfy the production team's desire to show the return of the Blipped heroes ahead of the battle. Directors Anthony and Joe Russo settled on a quiet delivery of the line after considering a couple versions of the sequence. Weta Digital worked on visual effects for the scene. The music that accompanies the scene, "Portals", was composed by Alan Silvestri. The scene received positive responses from critics and audiences.

== Scene summary ==
After Tony Stark and Thor are knocked out of battle by Thanos, Steve Rogers watches as Thanos's army arrives. Rogers hears static in his earpiece, then the voice of Sam Wilson, thought to be gone because of the Blip, (Note: As depicted in Avengers: Infinity War (2018)) announcing his arrival. As Rogers turns to look, a magical portal opens from Wakanda, showing the arrival of additional allies to aid in the battle. Dr. Stephen Strange, Wong, and other sorcerers continue to open additional portals from elsewhere on Earth and around the galaxy. Everyone gathers as Thanos and his army look on, and Rogers says "Avengers... assemble", leading everyone into battle.

== Background and development ==
The Avengers (1963) #16, the first issue featuring Captain America saying "Avengers Assemble", a phrase with which he has been associated ever since

The phrase "Avengers Assemble" is the most famous catchphrase used by the Avengers in the Marvel Comics. It is most often said by Captain America, but Thor first said it in Avengers (1963) #10 from 1964. The Avengers used other rally cries in the next few issues before officially adopting the phrase in Avengers (1963) #14 from 1965. In the following issue, Giant-Man shouts the phrase. In Avengers (1963) #16 from 1965, Captain America is featured on the cover saying the phrase, and he has since become the hero most associated with the line. After the team was formed in The Avengers (2012), people familiar with the comics started wondering when Captain America would say the line in the Marvel Cinematic Universe (MCU). Marvel Studios president Kevin Feige said soon after the film's release that the phrase was not included because there was not a good place for it. With the 360-degree shot of the team showing they were assembled, Feige felt that had more of an impact than if the line had been said in that moment. The phrase was teased at the end of Avengers: Age of Ultron (2015) when Captain America said "Avengers..." before the film cut to the credits. Writer and director Joss Whedon talked about the decision, saying he did not want to include the line, and he made sure that the scene could not be altered by the studio in the future. Captain America actor Chris Evans did not shoot a scene saying the complete phrase, and the "Avengers..." line was written into the script exactly how it was shown in the film.

=== Creating the scene ===
The "Avengers assemble" scene was not originally in Avengers: Endgame (2019), but was put together as a way to get Dr. Stephen Strange from the planet Titan to the Avengers Compound in upstate New York. In the first draft, all of the characters had immediately returned without a "cavalry" moment occurring, but co-writer Christopher Markus said that took away all of the momentum of the film. The scene had originally focused more on Rogers, but was changed to have the audience experience the portals from his perspective. Several ideas for the scene had been conceived, according to the film's visual effects supervisor Dan DeLeeuw, including a long panning shot of all of the film's actors when they were together for one day on set, although this "didn't play as well as [the crew] wanted". DeLeeuw worked with the previsualization team and editor Jeffrey Ford, and decided to use the portals instead. Previously dead characters return through the portals in the order that they perished in the Blip, the climactic event of the preceding film Avengers: Infinity War (2018) in which Thanos eradicated half of all life in the universe. The crew also decided to slow down the characters' arrivals to "give the audience a chance to welcome their heroes back". The film's directors, the Russo brothers, said that they had wanted the scene to start with the killed-off character Sam Wilson radioing "On your left" to Steve Rogers—a callback to the characters' first meeting—before the portals begin to open. They felt it was logical for the first portal to be from Wakanda, where Wilson died in Infinity War, and to have T'Challa and his Wakandan army arrive from it. Peter Parker / Spider-Man, the last to die in Infinity War, was chosen as the last character to return to be emotional for audiences. Markus and co-writer Stephen McFeely also considered including Hank Pym and Janet Van Dyne for the scene as well but ultimately did not have them because it "became impossible to track the people we did bring back". The scene was being worked on up until a month before Endgame's theatrical release in April 2019.

=== Filming and visual effects ===
The part of the scene with the portals had been shot a couple of times. The first version of that was quicker and had the music up "at a 10 early", according to McFeely, immediately after the characters returned. The Russo brothers decided to reshoot every character's return scene to give them their own individual "hero shots". Evans had not filmed a different take screaming the "Avengers assemble" line, although he initially felt that should have been the case. He felt it was like a nice juxtaposition in the end with the line being spoken softer and the characters subsequently yelling around him. The Russo brothers liked the softer delivery, which was done on the first take, telling Evans "That's it, don't even do the screaming one." On the Endgame commentary track, the Russos said it was their idea for Evans to deliver the line that way, acknowledging that the idea was "not entirely without a downside". Joe Russo added that the brothers thought the quieter delivery would be more interesting, but with Captain America catching Thor's hammer, Mjolnir, seconds before, causing a lot of cheers by audiences in the theaters, the Russos thought many people may not have even heard the line the first weekend of the film's release.

Weta Digital worked on the portals with visual effects supervisor Matt Aitken, who said the simulation team needed a "recipe" to make sure the portals design' could be discerned as being Doctor Strange's. However, it was altered as many of them being featured in the money shots of the returning characters. Weta used the original technique of creating the portals from previous MCU films. Another challenge was creating all the worlds that the portals were opening from as they were all computer-generated. It was necessary because the environments had to be filmed with the same camera as the destroyed Avengers Compound on the other side of the portal for it to "lock together and parallax". The VFX team had to ensure the characters did not appear to be coming from flat space where the portal is seen, with the goal to make it look like dimensional space. For the characters returning from Titan, there were four separate plates used. Drax and Mantis were together and Strange's return was filmed separately due to him floating, with Benedict Cumberbatch filming his part on a green screen. Tom Holland and Chris Pratt were both unavailable on the day, so they were both brought back at a later date with Pratt picked up with a separate motion control green screen element.

One of the last VFX additions to the film was a quick cameo of Howard the Duck. The character was not meant to appear in the finished film, but during an examination of the portals part of the scene, Joe Russo or Feige had suggested to VFX producer Jen Underdahl for his inclusion three weeks prior to the completion of visual effects. There was a gap when the Ravagers were coming out of Contraxia where he could be added and Underdahl contacted Weta to do so. They used older models of Howard the Duck from various MCU projects as reference, and Howard ended up appearing for approximately 17 or 18 frames in the film. Additionally, a rig and feather groom was also used to put Howard into the VFX team's pipeline and animation. After the "assemble" line, the actors ran forward towards a small group of people in motion capture suits that represented Thanos's army in order for the actors to have an eyeline. Once the face-off began, the battle transitioned from CG to real, on-set stunt work. DeLeeuw felt that the before-and-afters were some of the best ever as a result of the "general comedy" of what was actually happening on the set.

== Music ==
"Portals"
A sample of the score, leading up to the "Avengers assemble" line.

A track titled "Portals" was written for the scene by Endgame's composer, Alan Silvestri. Silvestri was told early on that the scene would be a key moment in the film. It took him a while to understand what was going on in the scene, with Silvestri saying that there was an initial temptation to "become too segmented" by having every character do something special as they returned. Ultimately, it was decided to make it more of an overview of the characters and that a new theme was needed because nothing else would fit. Silvestri created many versions of the song for the orchestra, including one with French horns playing and a choir singing. Eventually, he decided on what became the final version with a trumpet solo at the beginning of the score track as the Wakandans emerge from the mist. Silvestri describes "Portals" as a piece where parts repeat multiple times, but with keys changing and getting "bigger and more grand". The original Avengers theme had to ramp up after Captain America utters "Avengers... assemble" which leads to the Avengers and their allies charging into battle. The score was not always a unifying piece because the idea of the music changing while each character arrives was tossed around by the creative team "similar to the entrance themes used by professional wrestlers". Silvestri said the idea was not to combine various themes of characters or places like Wakanda, but instead focus on making a "bigger sonic deal out of every single portal opening". He sought to make the theme "celebratory" and "anthemic" in order to properly convey the significance of the moment. "Portals" transitioning into the Avengers theme after Rogers says "Assemble" was one of the things that changed the most in development, but in the end, Silvestri felt it was fitting as everyone was charging, saying it just felt like "pure Avengers". A video for "Portals" was released on June 13, 2019.

== Reception ==
The sequence has been well received, with fans in the theaters cheering, and the scene was considered to be one of the best in Endgame as well as the MCU by multiple critics. Mashable India referred to the sequence as "one of the most emotional moments in blockbuster movie history", while Screen Rant called it one of the defining moments of the "Infinity Saga". The sequence was ranked one of the best Captain America MCU scenes by Comic Book Resources, calling it the "ultimate battle cry". The line being saved for the right moment was applauded by critics, with Josh Siegel of The Hollywood Reporter praising the scene's direction and screenwriting, positively identifying it as being a well-executed version of the "'Call in the cavalry' trope of action filmmaking". Ana Dumarog of Screen Rant added that saving the phrase until that moment was good as she felt previous MCU films had not provided an adequate opportunity to use it until that point. Some critics said the scene was amplified because of the buildup of all of the films leading up to Endgame. Jaron Pak of Looper felt the scene had accurately encapsulated "the best of Endgame" and also comforted fans who were emotionally affected by the Blip, while Monita Mohan of Collider said the scene gave her "goosebumps". Individual praise was given to the score, Evans's performance, and the use of Wilson's callback line, with IGN's Joshua Yehl calling it the "perfect way to open the floodgates of hope", ranking the scene as being the sixth best out of ten in the film. However, it also received criticism for the depiction of the other characters. Siegel lamented that secondary characters, such as T'Challa and Peter Parker, were depicted as "glorified cameo performers" rather than being seen as the next generation of MCU heroes, while Mohan also noted the absence of Natasha Romanoff, who had died earlier in the film.

== In other media ==
The "Avengers assemble" scene was recreated by Disney Live Entertainment for the World of Color – One attraction at Disney California Adventure as part of the celebration of Disney's centennial. It debuted on January 27, 2023, and featured archive footage from Endgame alongside strobe lighting and pyrotechnics, as well as the Avengers musical themes. It was the first Disneyland nighttime spectacular to feature the Avengers and took place next to Avengers Campus. Jennifer Magill, Producer at Disney Live Entertainment said that the scene was chosen because "the portals were such iconic entrances and something we could translate into our world perfectly".
