= Avengers: Endgame (soundtrack) =

2019 film score by Alan Silvestri

Avengers: Endgame (Original Motion Picture Soundtrack)

Film score by Alan Silvestri
- Released: April 26, 2019 (digital); May 24, 2019 (physical)
- Recorded: January–March 2019
- Studio: Abbey Road Studios
- Genre: Film score
- Length: 116:52 (digital); 74:14 (physical)
- Labels: Hollywood; Marvel Music
- Producers: Alan Silvestri; David Bifano

Alan Silvestri chronology
Welcome to Marwen (2018)	Avengers: Endgame (Original Motion Picture Soundtrack) (2019)	The Witches (2020)

Avengers: Endgame (Original Motion Picture Soundtrack) is the film score for the Marvel Studios film Avengers: Endgame composed and conducted by Alan Silvestri. Hollywood Records released the soundtrack album digitally on April 26, 2019, with the physical formats being released on May 24, 2019.

== Background ==
In June 2016, Alan Silvestri, who composed the score for The Avengers, was revealed to be returning to score both Infinity War and Endgame. Discussing the tone of the film, Silvestri said that the Russos wanted it to be "operatic" for both films, with Endgame needing an "aggressive musical approach". He stated that he found the film's pace to be "invigorating, after having thunderous percussion and powerful brass propelling the massive battle sequences". Silvestri reprises his themes from the previous Avengers (2012) films and Captain America: The First Avenger (2011), as well as several other MCU themes, including Christophe Beck's Ant-Man theme, Michael Giacchino's Doctor Strange (2016) theme, and Pinar Toprak's Captain Marvel (2019) theme. Silvestri also reassured fans that Thanos's theme from Infinity War was present in the film. The score was recorded at Abbey Road Studios in London with the London Symphony Orchestra consisting of about 95 musicians with Silvestri and orchestrator Mark Graham conducting the sessions. Scoring concluded in late March 2019.

Several classic rock songs are featured in the film, with four of them featured on the soundtrack. The film also includes "Come and Get Your Love" by Redbone and "It's Been a Long, Long Time" by Jule Styne and Sammy Cahn, with these songs previously included in the soundtracks for Guardians of the Galaxy and Captain America: The Winter Soldier, respectively. Other songs not included on the film's soundtrack release include Richard Sherman's "Make Way for Tomorrow Today", as arranged by Silvestri, "Doom and Gloom" by the Rolling Stones, "Hey Lawdy Mama" by Steppenwolf, "Supersonic Rocket Ship" by the Kinks, and "Dear Mr. Fantasy" by Traffic.

A music video for the track "Portals", used for the "Avengers assemble" scene where Doctor Strange and his fellow Masters of the Mystic Arts gather reinforcements to help the Avengers in the final showdown with Thanos, was released on June 13.

== Track listing ==
All music composed by Alan Silvestri.

Avengers: Endgame (Original Motion Picture Soundtrack) - Digital Release
No.	Title	Length
1.	"Totally Fine"	4:29
2.	"Arrival"	1:49
3.	"No Trust"	3:08
4.	"Where Are They?"	3:12
5.	"Becoming Whole Again"	3:48
6.	"I Figured It Out"	4:30
7.	"Perfectly Not Confusing"	4:46
8.	"You Shouldn't Be Here"	3:33
9.	"The How Works"	3:50
10.	"Snap Out of It"	2:24
11.	"So Many Stairs"	1:51
12.	"One Shot"	2:04
13.	"Watch Each Other's Six"	3:56
14.	"I Can't Risk This"	4:48
15.	"He Gave It Away"	3:42
16.	"The Tool of a Thief"	2:58
17.	"The Measure of a Hero"	3:05
18.	"Destiny Fulfilled"	4:05
19.	"In Plain Sight"	3:14
20.	"How Do I Look?"	2:06
21.	"Whatever It Takes"	2:56
22.	"Not Good"	1:53
23.	"Gotta Get Out"	2:38
24.	"I Was Made for This"	4:37
25.	"Tres Amigos"	3:37
26.	"Tunnel Scape"	3:16
27.	"Worth It"	4:15
28.	"Portals"	3:17
29.	"Get This Thing Started"	4:54
30.	"The One"	2:08
31.	"You Did Good"	1:57
32.	"The Real Hero"	5:54
33.	"Five Seconds"	1:45
34.	"Go Ahead"	2:57
35.	"Main on End"	3:11
Total length:		166:74

Avengers: Endgame (Original Motion Picture Soundtrack) - Physical Release
No.	Title	Length
1.	"Totally Fine"	4:29
2.	"Arrival"	1:49
3.	"Where Are They?"	3:12
4.	"Becoming Whole Again"	3:48
5.	"I Figured It Out"	4:30
6.	"Perfectly Not Confusing"	4:46
7.	"You Shouldn't Be Here"	3:33
8.	"The How Works"	3:50
9.	"One Shot"	2:04
10.	"Snap Out of It"	2:24
11.	"So Many Stairs"	1:51
12.	"Watch Each Other's Six"	3:56
13.	"I Can't Risk This"	4:48
14.	"He Gave It Away"	3:42
15.	"The Tool of a Thief"	2:58
16.	"The Measure of a Hero"	3:05
17.	"In Plain Sight"	3:14
18.	"Whatever It Takes"	2:56
19.	"Not Good"	1:53
20.	"I Was Made For This"	4:37
21.	"Tres Amigos"	3:37
22.	"Worth It"	4:15
23.	"Portals"	3:17
24.	"The One"	2:08
25.	"You Did Good"	1:57
26.	"The Real Hero"	5:54
27.	"Go Ahead"	2:57
28.	"Main On End"	3:11
Total length:		74:14

== Charts ==
Chart (2019)	Peak position
Australian Digital Albums (ARIA)	8
Belgian Albums (Ultratop Flanders)	179
Belgian Albums (Ultratop Wallonia)	181
French Albums (SNEP)	192
Scottish Albums (Official Charts)	64
Swiss Albums (Schweizer Hitparade)	98
US Billboard 200	88

== Accolades ==
Award	Date of ceremony	Category	Recipient(s)	Result	Ref(s)
Saturn Awards	September 13, 2019	Best Music	Alan Silvestri	Nominated	
Hollywood Music in Media Awards	November 20, 2019	Best Original Score – Sci-fi/Fantasy	Alan Silvestri	Won	
Grammy Awards	January 26, 2020	Best Score Soundtrack for Visual Media	Alan Silvestri	Nominated	
