= Rotten Tomatoes Movieclips =

American streaming video service

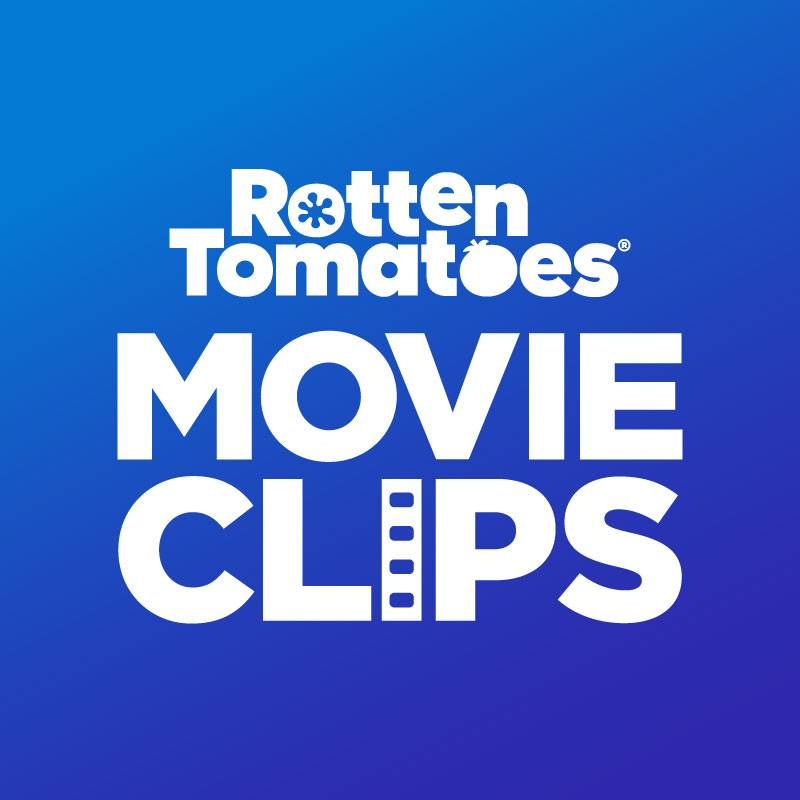
- Former names: Movieclips (2009–2014); Fandango Movieclips (2014–2022)
- Website type: Video on demand
- Available in: English
- Founded: 2009; 17 years ago
- Headquarters: Venice, Los Angeles, California, U.S.
- Owners: Versant (75%); Skydance Corporation (25%)
- Founders: Zach James; Rich Raddon
- Parent: Fandango Media
- Website: www.movieclips.com (redirects to the YouTube channel)
- Launched: December 3, 2009; 16 years ago
- Current status: Active

Rotten Tomatoes Movieclips (formerly Movieclips and later Fandango Movieclips) is a company located in Venice, Los Angeles that offers streaming video of film clips, trailers, promotional content, and extra features from such Hollywood film companies as Universal Pictures, (Note: Including content from DreamWorks Animation.) Amazon MGM Studios, Paramount Pictures, Warner Bros. Entertainment, (Note: Including content from subsidiaries New Line Cinema and Castle Rock Entertainment.) Walt Disney Studios, (Note: Trailers, promotional content, and extra features only.) 20th Century Studios, and Sony Pictures, (Note: Including content from subsidiaries Destination Films, Sony Pictures Classics, and Triumph Films.) along with other studios such as Lionsgate Films and DreamWorks Pictures.

== History ==
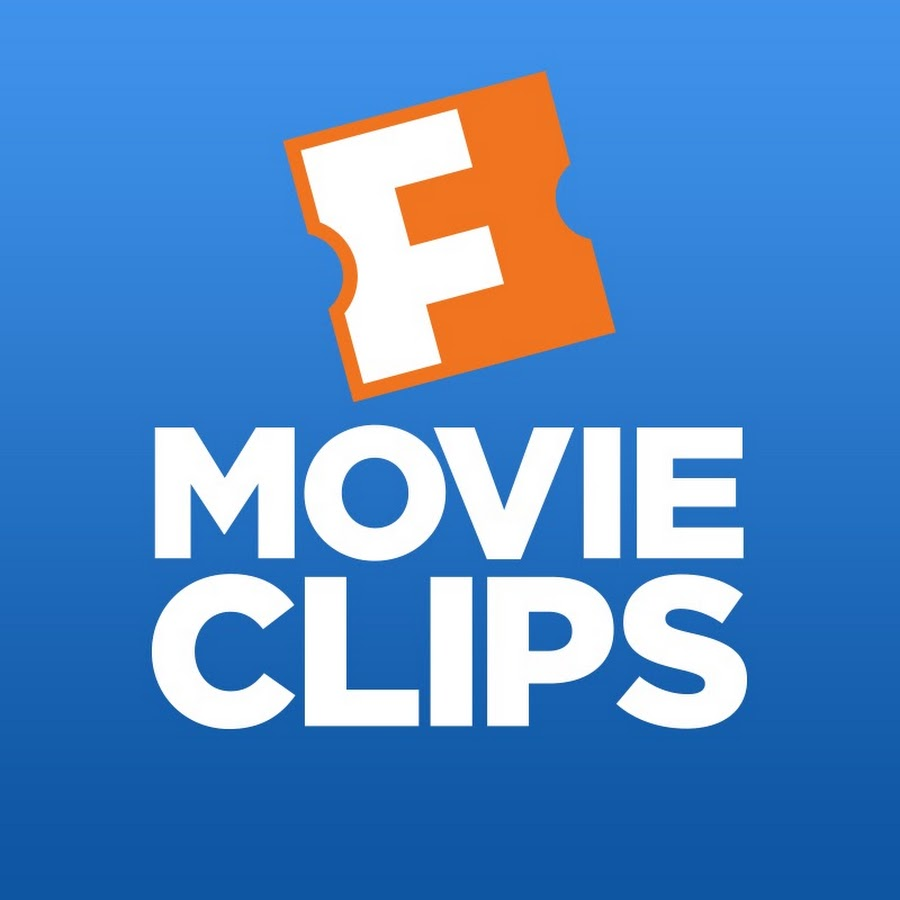
Second logo; used when the channel was under the title of "Fandango Movieclips."

Movieclips was founded in 2009 as a division of the online video company Zefr, beginning as a website which allowed the user to search through a library of over 12,000 film clips. In partnership with Google, Movieclips uploaded over 20,000 clips to YouTube in 2011. In 2014, Movieclips was acquired by Fandango and was renamed to "Fandango Movieclips."

Fandango Movieclips later rebranded to "Rotten Tomatoes Movieclips" in 2022.

As of July 2026, the YouTube channel has over 66.4 million subscribers.
