= James Michael Cline =

American financier (1960–2024)

James Michael Cline (1960 – July 16, 2024) was an American financier and the founder of Fandango.

== Early life and education ==
Cline was born in 1960. His mother, Rose Marie Cline, retired as a division administrator at the Lamont Doherty Geological Observatory of Columbia University in New York. His father, James G. Cline, was a managing partner at Dames & Moore.

Cline earned his undergraduate degree from Cornell University and an MBA from Harvard University.

== Career ==
Cline began his entrepreneurial career in the early 1980s by importing hand warmers from Japan. His private-equity firm, Accretive, which invested in Fandango, was also involved in a controversy during the 2000s. The controversy arose after the firm created a debt-collection business while also holding a stake in the National Arbitration Forum, a major consumer-debt-arbitration body.

At the time of his death, Cline was the executive chairman of Juxtapose, which supported the launch of tech businesses in sectors including health care and property management. He owned properties in affluent areas such as Palm Beach, Florida; Greenwich, Connecticut; and the Hamptons. Cline also served as chairman of the National Fish and Wildlife Foundation, focusing on the preservation of big cats, including jaguars.

Cline, days after gallbladder surgery, left a suicide note before jumping from the 20th floor, landing in a third-story courtyard of the Kimberly Hotel in Manhattan.
