= Atom Tickets =

US movie ticket company

Atom Tickets, LLC
- Company type: Private
- Founded: December 1, 2014; 11 years ago
- Founder: Matthew Bakal; Ameesh Paleja; Geoff Shaevitz
- Headquarters: Santa Monica, California, United States
- Area served: United States; Canada
- Services: Movie Ticketing
- Website: atomtickets.com

Atom Tickets is an American ticketing company based in Santa Monica, California that sells movie tickets and services through its app and website in the United States and Canada.

== History ==
Established on December 1, 2014, Atom Tickets' Series A funding was led by Lionsgate. It was started by three partners, Matthew Bakal, Ameesh Paleja, and Geoff Shaevitz. Paleja says that the idea for Atom Tickets came about because he and his friends, "were frustrated with the experience of coordinating a night out at the movies with friends. Between planning the group and picking the movie, the theater, and the show time, plans often fall apart." On February 1, 2016, they announced a completed Series B round of financing from investors that include The Walt Disney Company, 20th Century Fox and Lionsgate. On May 21, 2018, Dwayne Johnson and Dany Garcia joined as investors and advisers.

== Services ==
Atom Tickets allows users to buy movie tickets through their app or at their website. In addition to ticket sales, some theaters offer advanced concession sales through the service.

In March 2019, Atom Tickets launched Atom Movie Access, a movie subscription service for cinemas that allows exhibitors to create their own customized movie subscription plan.
