= Fandango Media =

American media corporation

Fandango Media, LLC

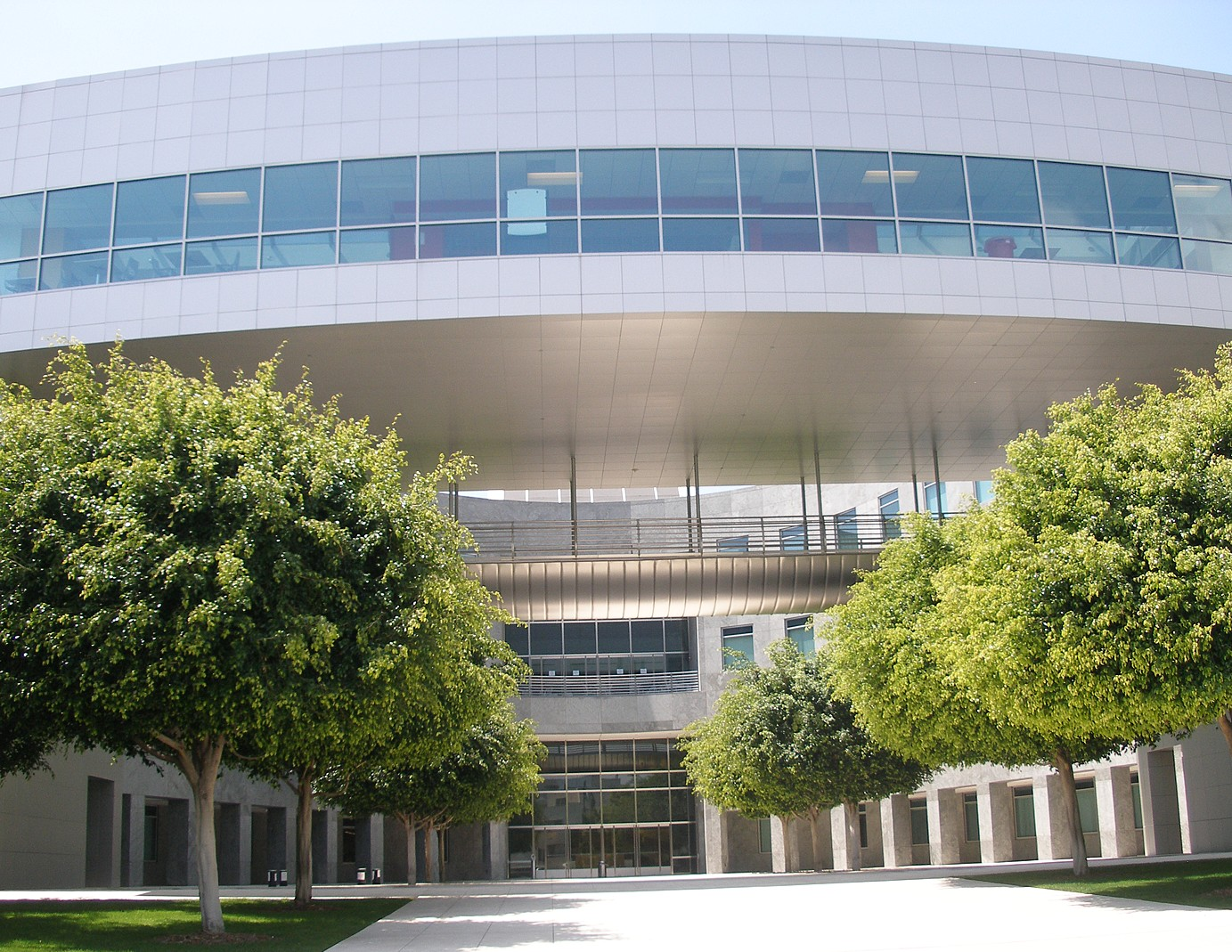
- Fandango headquarters in Beverly Hills in 2007
- Formerly: ticketmakers.com (2000–2007)
- Type: Joint venture
- Founded: April 27, 2000; 26 years ago
- Founder: James Michael Cline
- Headquarters: Beverly Hills, California, United States
- Owners: Versant (75%); Skydance (25%)
- Parent: Versant Digital Platforms and Ventures (75%); Skydance Direct-to-Consumer (25%)
- Divisions: Fandango; Fandango streaming; INDY Cinema Group; MovieTickets.com; Rotten Tomatoes; Rotten Tomatoes Movieclips
- Website: fandango.com

Fandango Media, LLC is an American ticketing company that sells movie tickets via its website and its mobile app. It also owns the Fandango streaming digital video store and streaming service (formerly owned by Walmart and originally known as Vudu), and Rotten Tomatoes, a website that provides television and streaming media information. It is a joint-venture 75% owned by Versant, while Skydance retains the remaining 25%.

== History ==
In 2000, James Michael Cline, with Art Levitt, founded Fandango. In 2003, Fandango secured $15 million in funding from venture capitalists Technology Crossover Ventures. Fandango was privately held. Then-owners included exhibition chains (Loews Cineplex Entertainment, Regal Cinemas, Carmike Cinemas, Cinemark Theatres, General Cinema Theatres, Edwards Theatres and Century Theatres) and venture capital firms (Accretive Technology Partners and General Atlantic Partners).

On April 11, 2007, Comcast acquired Fandango, and planned to integrate it into a new entertainment website called "Fancast.com"– to launch in the summer of 2007. In June 2008, the domain Movies.com was acquired from Disney. In March 2012, Fandango announced a partnership with Yahoo! Movies, making Fandango the official online and mobile ticketer for registered users of the Yahoo! service. That October, Paul Yanover was named President of Fandango.

Fandango made its first international acquisition in September 2015 when it bought the Brazilian ticketing company Ingresso, which provides ticketing to a variety of Brazilian entertainment events, including the biannual Rock in Rio festival. On January 29, 2016, Fandango announced its acquisition of M-GO, a joint venture between Technicolor SA and DreamWorks Animation (NBCUniversal acquired the latter company three months later), which it would later rebrand as "FandangoNOW".

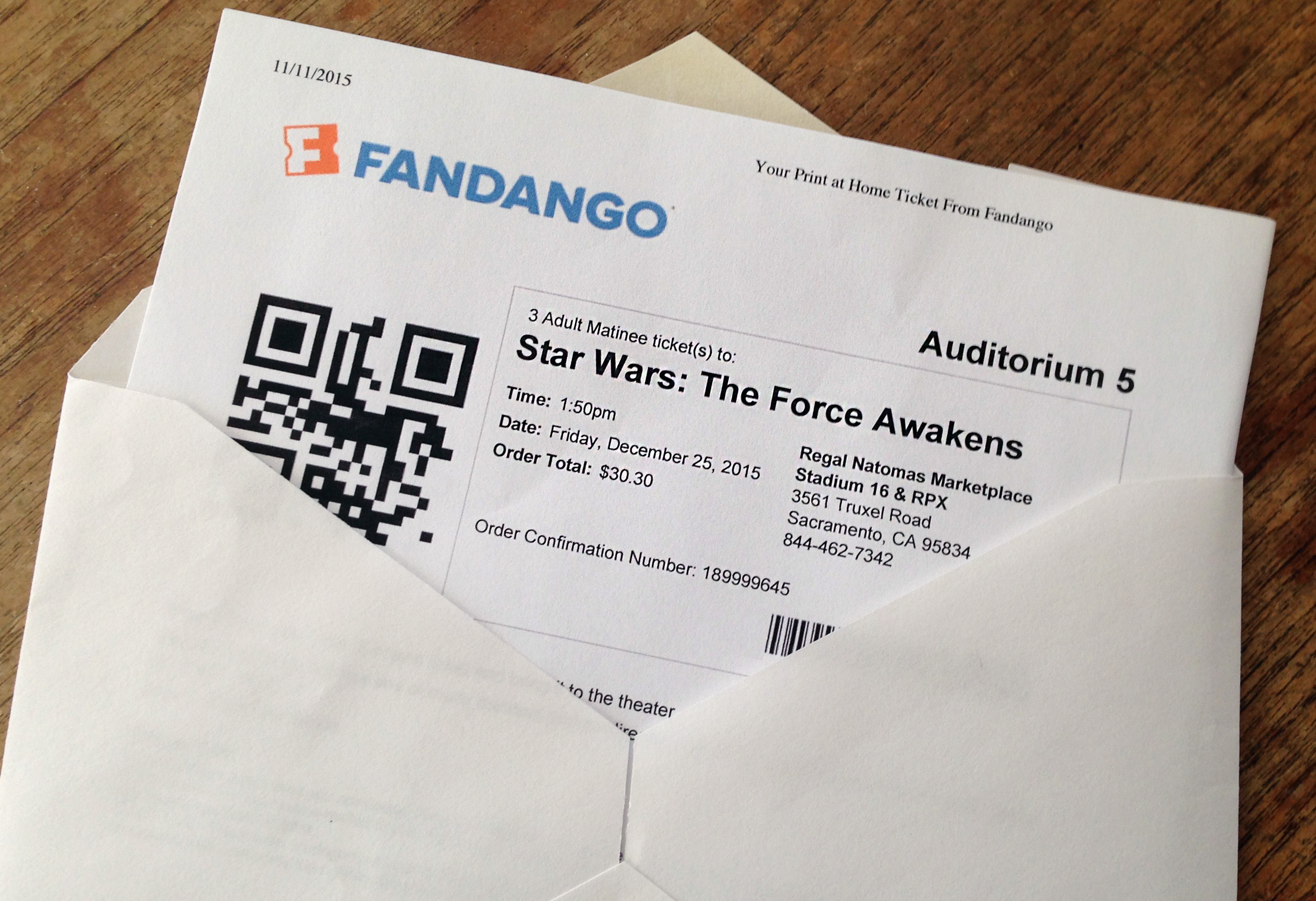
Ticket to Star Wars: The Force Awakens

In February 2016, Fandango announced its acquisition of Flixster and Rotten Tomatoes from Time Warner's Warner Bros. Entertainment. As part of the deal, Warner Bros. would become a 30% shareholder of the combined Fandango company. Its stake was reduced to 25% by 2019.

In December 2016, Fandango Media purchased Cinepapaya, a Peru-based website for purchasing movie tickets, for an undisclosed amount. Later that same month, Fandango moved to Fox Interactive Media's former headquarters in Beverly Hills. On April 20, 2020, Walmart entered into an agreement to sell Vudu to Fandango Media. The sale was completed on July 6, 2020. Vudu was rebranded as Fandango at Home in 2024. On July 16, 2024, Fandango founder J. Michael Cline committed suicide at the age of 64. On July 6, 2026 Fandango at Home was rebranded as Fandango.

In 2026, Comcast completed the spin off of NBCUniversal's cable networks and selected digital properties as Versant, which also inherited Comcast's Stake in Fandango Media. Also in 2026, Paramount Skydance won the bid to buy Warner Bros. Discovery including its 25% stake in Fandango Media. In October 6, 2026, The merger between Paramount Skydance and Warner Bros Discovery was completed and the new resulting entity called Skydance Corporation inherited Warner Bros Discovery's 25% Stake in Fandango Media.

== Services ==
Fandango's website also offers exclusive film clips, trailers, celebrity interviews, reviews by users, movie descriptions, and some web-based games to Fandango members. As of March 5, 2015, Fandango provides members the ability to refund or exchange their orders up to 2 hours before the showtime of their film. Fandango's Android app was listed among Techland's 50 Best Android Applications for 2013.

== Competition ==
Until its acquisition of its rival MovieTickets.com in 2017, Fandango was one of three major online advance movie ticket sale sites, along with MovieTickets.com and Atom Tickets. Before being acquired by Comcast in April 2007, Fandango was privately owned; its major stakeholder, Regal Cinemas, which owned the United Artists and Hoyts theater chains, was the second largest movie-theater chain in the U.S. Regal and its partners founded Fandango partly to prevent the older MovieTickets.com from establishing a monopoly on phone and online ticketing services. (MovieTickets.com was publicly owned and traded under the stock symbol HOLL.) The company's advertising agency reportedly chose the name "Fandango" because it sounded "fun, kinetic and smart", and "easily pronounce[d] and remember[ed]--even though it really has nothing to do with movies."

Prior to 2012, Fandango did not provide online ticketing for many AMC Theatres. However, it provided online ticketing for AMC Theatres that were originally part of the Loews Cineplex Entertainment chain, due to contractual obligations in place prior to the 2005 merger of the two movie chains. Loews had previously attempted to break the contract in 2002 under pressure of bankruptcy and from (then) AOL Moviefone and its partner, Loews' Cineplex subsidiary; Fandango successfully sued both Loews and Moviefone and retained Loews' business. As of February 8, 2012, Fandango began providing ticketing for all AMC Theatres in the US, after which MovieTickets.com's fellow shareholders sued AMC for breach of contract. AMC and MovieTickets.com settled in 2013, with an agreement that the theater chain's online ticketing would be available on both Fandango and MovieTickets.com. In May 2012, Fandango announced a partnership with Moviefone, MovieTickets.com's former partner. Atom Tickets, a movie ticketing app and website launched in 2014, has been called a "serious competitor" of Fandango's.

== Controversies ==
In July 2009, it was revealed that Fandango and other websites, including buy.com and Orbitz, were linked with controversial Web loyalty programs, also known as post-transaction marketers. Fandango reportedly gave the third party access to Fandango customers' credit cards. In December 2013, Fandango launched a trademark dispute when WWE tried to trademark the name for use by the professional wrestler Fandango (né Johnny Curtis).

In August 2014, the Federal Trade Commission (FTC) approved final orders settling charges against Fandango for misrepresenting to the public the security of their mobile app and for failing to protect the transmission of Fandango customers' sensitive personal information. The Fandango mobile app assured consumers, during checkout, that their credit card information was stored and transmitted securely. However, the FTC claims against Fandango focused on failures relating to both the implementation and testing of the Secure Sockets Layer (SSL) certificates for 4 years following the mobile app's launch in March 2009. According to the FTC, Fandango commissioned security audits in 2011, but the audits were limited in scope and did not review the security of the app's transmission of information. The FTC also alleged that Fandango did not implement effective channels for security complaints and instead relied on its general customer service system to handle security vulnerability reporting.

Rotten Tomatoes has received several criticisms relating to its scoring. In October 2015, FiveThirtyEight published a story and podcast calling Fandango's metrics on user ratings into question. The investigation noted that the site's method for calculating ratings made it rare for a movie to ever receive an overall rating below three stars. The problem seemingly extended from Fandango's habit of rounding ratings up to the nearest half. Fandango, in response, noted that this was a glitch it was working to repair. Nevertheless, Gizmodo cited the study after Fandango announced the purchase of Rotten Tomatoes amid fears that the purchase would "ruin" the site. Other complaints have concerned apparent political bias, with an analysis of Rotten Tomatoes scores seemingly preferencing films which exhibit progressive values and down-rating conservative ones. Other criticisms suggest score manipulation for commercial reasons: in 2012, 32 million audience votes suddenly appeared for the Star Wars film 'Revenge of the Sith', in what was called by Screenrant "a clear example of nefarious manipulation".

In December 2017, Fandango received hundreds of complaints regarding its delivery of Star Wars: The Last Jedi tickets. Forbes reported that issues began within hours of advanced sales' becoming available for the new Star Wars film, with customers complaining of long wait times and website glitches.

== Fandango Latam ==
Fandango Latam
- Formerly: Cinepapaya
- Type: Division
- Founded: 2012; 14 years ago
- Defunct: 2020; 6 years ago
- Headquarters: Lima, Peru
- Services: Movie ticketing and content
- Parent: Fandango Media
- Website: fandango.lat

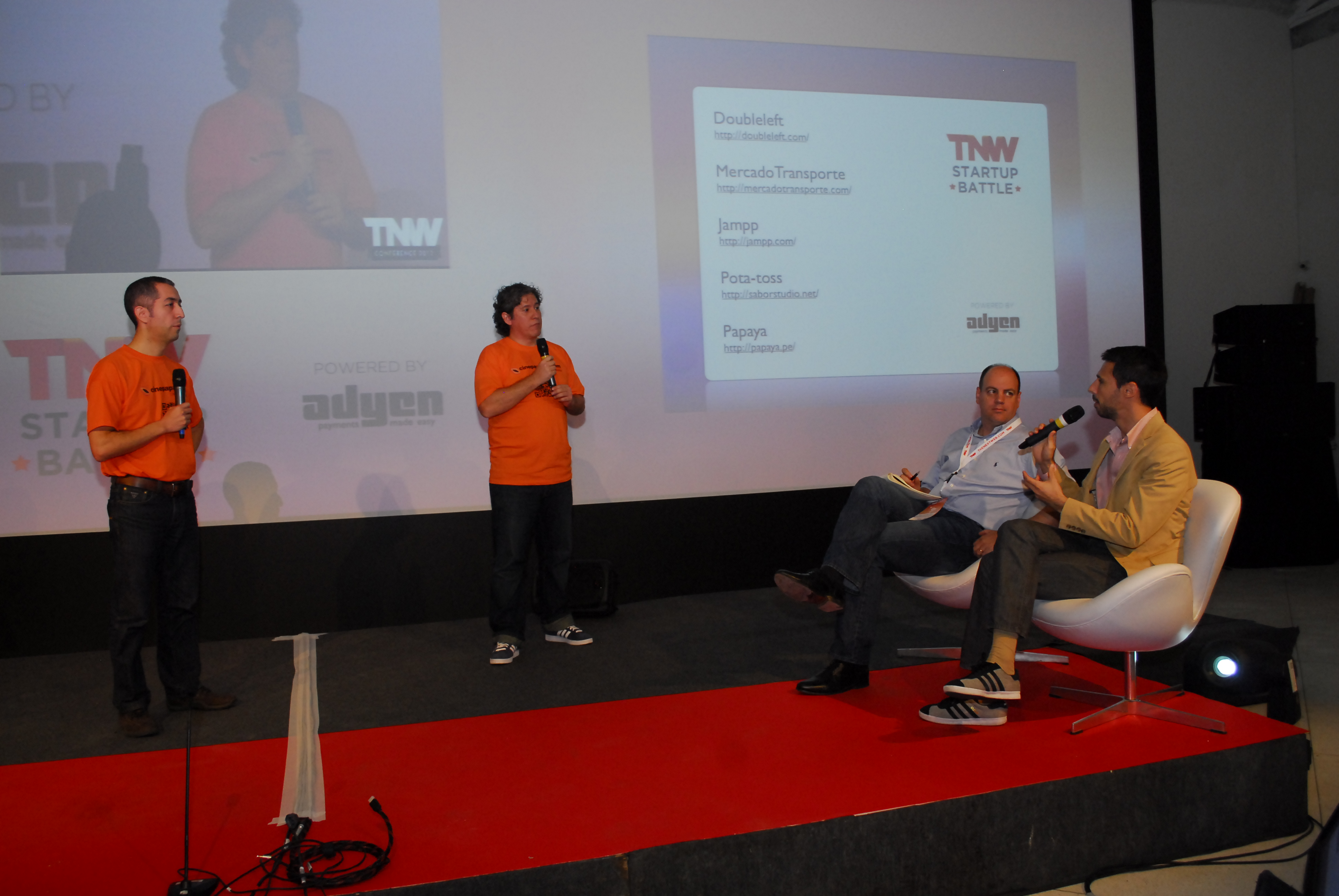
Cinepapaya founders Manuel Olguin and Gary Urteaga at TNW Conference Latin America 2012.

Fandango Latam, previously known as Cinepapaya, was a movie ticket-selling website that served as the Latin American arm of Fandango Media.

Cinepapaya was first launched in 2012, receiving funding from 500 Startups and Telefonica's startup accelerator Wayra. It participated also in the Start-Up Chile's acceleration program.

In 2014, Cinepapaya received a $2M investment from Brazilian internet conglomerate Movile. As of May 2015, Cinepapaya was transactional in Peru, Chile and Colombia, and served content in 17 countries in South America (as for May 2015), expecting to close 2015 with 20 countries, and then venture into other emerging markets.

In December 2016, Fandango Media purchased Cinepapaya, for an undisclosed amount. Fandango had previously acquired Cinepapaya's Brazilian competitor Ingresso in 2015, and merged the two entities to create Fandango Latam. In March 2017, Fandango announced a new branding strategy for its Latin American assets, and definitively rebranded Cinepapaya to Fandango Latam.

In October 2018, Fandango Latam announced several multi-year deals with Cinépolis, Cinemark Theatres, National Amusements, and Cinemex, adding 5,000 new screens to Fandango's Latin American inventory. This deal turned Fandango into the largest online ticketer in Latin America.

Fandango announced their exit from the Latin American market in 2020, as a result of the impact of the COVID-19 pandemic on the cinema industry. This notably excluded the operation of the ticket merchant Ingresso in Brazil, which would later be acquired by Universo Online.

== Video on demand ==
In early 2016, Fandango acquired the M-GO video on demand service, which was re-branded as FandangoNOW. Fandango later purchased Vudu from Walmart in July 2020. FandangoNOW was then merged with Vudu on August 3, 2021. While Fandango initially chose to keep the "Vudu" name for brand recognition as the larger of the two services, it was renamed to Fandango at Home on February 15, 2024.

In June 2023, AMC Theatres (which has been a long-time partner of Fandango's online movie ticketing service) announced that Vudu would subsume its AMC Theatres On Demand service, with its library being transferred to the platform and upgraded to higher quality formats where applicable.

On July 6, 2026 the company announced that its movie tickets and streaming offerings would be brought together under one name, Fandango.

== See also ==
- IMDb
- Roku
