= SILK =

Audio codec and compression format

- Developers: Skype Limited, Microsoft
- Initial release: 2009; 16 years ago
- Stable release: 1.0.9 / 2012; 13 years ago
- Written in: C, C++
- Operating system: Microsoft Windows, macOS, Linux, Android, iOS
- Predecessor: SVOPC
- Successor: Satin
- Type: Audio codec
- License: BSD 2-Clause License

- Filename extension: .sil, .SIL
- Internet media type: audio/SILK
- Magic number: #!SILK\n
- Initial release: March 2009; 16 years ago
- Latest release: SDK 1.0.9; 2012; 13 years ago
- Type of format: Audio
- Extended to: Opus
- Standard: Internet Draft

SILK is an audio compression format and audio codec developed by Skype Limited, now a Microsoft subsidiary. It was developed for use in Skype, as a replacement for the SVOPC codec. Since licensing out, it has also been used by others. It has been extended to the Internet standard Opus codec.

== Details ==
Block diagram of the SILK encoder

Skype Limited announced that SILK can use a sampling frequency of 8, 12, 16 or 24 kHz and a bit rate from 6 to 40 kbit/s. It can also use a low algorithmic delay of 25 ms (20 ms frame size + 5 ms look-ahead). The reference implementation is written in the C programming language. The codec technology is based on linear predictive coding (LPC). The SILK binary SDK is available.

== License ==
The SILK codec is patented and licensed separately from the SILK SDK. The codec is open-source, freeware, available royalty free with restrictions on use and distribution. The SDK was initially available only by application by giving details of name, address, phone, and description of how SILK will be used. As of 2012 (version 1.0.9) the SDK can by downloaded without application, but the licence restricts the use to internal evaluation and testing purposes only, excluding software distribution or use in any commercial product or service.

== History ==
SILK replaces the previously used SVOPC in Skype, which was a in-house solution to replace the iSAC and iLBC, which again were licensed from Global IP Solutions. The SILK codec was a separate development branch from SVOPC and it has been under development for over 3 years. It was announced in January 2009 on the Consumer Electronics Show and was integrated in Skype for the first time in version 4.0 beta 3 from January 7, 2009, with the final version being released on February 3. On March 3, 2009, Skype Limited announced that the SILK codec will be available soon under a royalty free license to third-party software and hardware developers. The first draft of the SILK Speech Codec description was submitted to the Internet Engineering Task Force (IETF) as a candidate for the standardisation of a new Internet wideband audio codec on July 6, 2009, thereby openly publishing the format along with the source code of the reference implementation. There is also a first draft of the RTP Payload Format and File Storage Format for SILK Speech and Audio Codec.

=== Opus ===
SILK is a foundation (with CELT) of the hybrid codec Opus (at the time called "Harmony") that was submitted to the IETF in September 2010, and was chosen as the final candidate for the new standard. Opus was published as an IETF proposed standard in September 2012 and Skype announced that they would be using Opus going forward.

== Usage ==
- The stable version of SILK was first introduced in Skype 4.0 Beta 3 for Windows, released on January 7, 2009.
- The final version of Skype 4.0 was released on February 3, 2009.
- On March 22, 2011, the Steam game platform started using the SILK codec for its integrated in-game and community voice chat.
- Later on 14 April, in Team Fortress 2, the codec was implemented into the in-game voice chat.
- On January 29, 2013, the updated to SteamPipe platform GoldSrc started using the SILK codec for the in-game voice chat.
- It has been found being used on Zoom.

== See also ==
- Skype protocol
- Comparison of audio coding formats
- Forward error correction
