= Internet Speech Audio Codec =

Audio codec standard

internet Speech Audio Codec
- Internet media type: audio/isac
- Developed by: Global IP Solutions, now Google Inc
- Type of format: Audio compression format

Codec
- Developer(s): Global IP Solutions, now Google Inc
- Written in: C
- Operating system: Cross-platform
- Type: Audio codec, reference implementation
- License: formerly proprietary, now 3-clause BSD
- Website: webrtc.org

internet Speech Audio Codec (iSAC) is a wideband speech codec, developed by Global IP Solutions (GIPS) (acquired by Google Inc in 2011). It is suitable for VoIP applications and streaming audio. The encoded blocks have to be encapsulated in a suitable protocol for transport, e.g. RTP.

It is one of the codecs used by AIM Triton, the Gizmo5, QQ, and Google Talk. It was formerly a proprietary codec licensed by Global IP Solutions. As of June 2011, it is part of open source WebRTC project, which includes a royalty-free license for iSAC when using the WebRTC codebase.

== Parameters and features ==
- Sampling frequency of 16 kHz (wideband) or 32 kHz (superwideband)
- Adaptive and variable bit rate of 10 kbit/s to 32 kbit/s (wideband) or 10 kbit/s to 52 kbit/s (superwideband)
- Adaptive packet size 30 to 60 ms
- Complexity comparable to G.722.2 at comparable bit-rates
- Algorithmic delay of frame size plus 3 ms

== See also ==
- iLBC
- Opus (audio codec)
- SILK
- G.722
- Speex
- List of codecs
