= OpenWebRTC =

- Original author: Ericsson
- Initial release: September 2014; 11 years ago
- Preview release: 0.3.0 / 25 April 2015; 10 years ago
- Repository: github.com/EricssonResearch/openwebrtc
- Written in: C, JavaScript
- Operating system: iOS, OS X, Linux, Android
- Standard: WebRTC
- License: BSD (free software)
- Website: github.com/EricssonResearch/openwebrtc

OpenWebRTC (OWR) is a free software stack that implements the WebRTC standard, a set of protocols and application programming interfaces defined by the World Wide Web Consortium (W3C) and the Internet Engineering Task Force (IETF). It is an alternative to the reference implementation that is based on software from Global IP Solutions (GIPS).

It is published under the terms of the Simplified (2-clause) BSD license and officially supports iOS, Linux, OS X, and Android operating systems. It is meant to also work outside web browsers, e.g. to power native mobile apps.

It is mostly written in C and based largely on the multimedia framework GStreamer and a number of other, smaller external libraries. It officially supports both VP8 and H.264 as video formats. For H.264 it uses OpenH264 to which Cisco pays the patent licensing bills.

Development of OpenWebRTC started at Ericsson Research under the lead of Stefan Ålund. They released it as free software in September 2014, together with the proof-of-concept web browser "Bowser" that is based on the stack. Among other things, this initial version didn't support data channels yet and was said to still be less mature than Google's reference implementation.
