= TringMe =

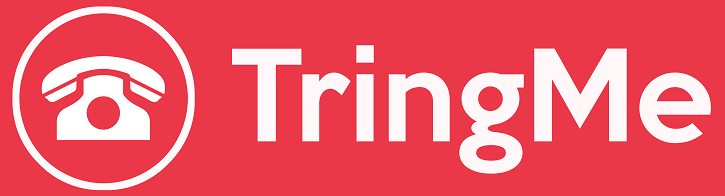
Stable release
- Android: 2.9.70 / 21 December 2019; 6 years ago
- iOS: 1.4.1 / 7 January 2019; 7 years ago
- Operating system: Android, iOS
- Available in: English
- Type: International Calling
- Website: tringme.com

TringMe is an Indian internet telephony company based in Bangalore. It focuses on a Flash-based browser client and the related API.

== History ==
It was founded by Yusuf Motiwala & Apul Nahata in 2007, after Yusuf's father complained of downloads required to use VoIP programs. The firm focused on a browser-based app. The duo invested ₹700,000 of their own money initially in the venture. In October 2009, TringMe released a Facebook app. It won the NASSCOM's Most Innovative Startup award in 2009.

== See also ==
- Skype
- Gizmo5
