= Variable bitrate =

Files in which the rate of bit transmission is non-constant

Principle of VBR

Variable bitrate (VBR) is a term used in telecommunications and computing that relates to the bitrate used in sound or video encoding. As opposed to constant bitrate (CBR), VBR files vary the amount of output data per time segment. VBR allows a higher bitrate (and therefore more storage space) to be allocated to the more complex segments of media files while less space is allocated to less complex segments. The average of these rates can be calculated to produce an average bitrate for the file.

MP3, WMA and AAC audio files can optionally be encoded in VBR, while Opus and Vorbis are encoded in VBR by default. Variable bit rate encoding is also commonly used on MPEG-2 video, MPEG-4 Part 2 video (Xvid, DivX, etc.), MPEG-4 Part 10/H.264 video, Theora, Dirac and other video compression formats. Additionally, variable rate encoding is inherent in lossless compression schemes such as FLAC and Apple Lossless.

== Advantages and disadvantages of VBR ==
The advantages of VBR are that it produces a better quality-to-space ratio compared to a CBR file of the same data. The bits available are used more flexibly to encode the sound or video data more accurately, with fewer bits used in less demanding passages and more bits used in difficult-to-encode passages.

The disadvantages are that it may take more time to encode, as the process is more complex, and that some hardware might not be compatible with VBR files.

== Methods of VBR encoding ==
=== Multi-pass encoding and single-pass encoding ===
VBR is created using so-called single-pass encoding or multi-pass encoding. Single-pass encoding analyzes and encodes the data "on the fly" and it is also used in constant bitrate encoding. Single-pass encoding is used when the encoding speed is most important — e.g. for real-time encoding. Single-pass VBR encoding is usually controlled by the fixed quality setting or by the bitrate range (minimum and maximum allowed bitrate) or by the average bitrate setting. Multi-pass encoding is used when the encoding quality is most important. Multi-pass encoding cannot be used in real-time encoding, live broadcast or live streaming. Multi-pass encoding takes much longer than single-pass encoding, because every pass means one pass through the input data (usually through the whole input file). Multi-pass encoding is used only for VBR encoding, because CBR encoding doesn't offer any flexibility to change the bitrate. The most common multi-pass encoding is two-pass encoding. In the first pass of two-pass encoding, the input data is being analyzed and the result is stored in a log file. In the second pass, the collected data from the first pass is used to achieve the best encoding quality. In a video encoding, two-pass encoding is usually controlled by the average bitrate setting or by the bitrate range setting (minimal and maximal allowed bitrate) or by the target video file size setting.

=== Bitrate range ===
This VBR encoding method allows the user to specify a bitrate range — a minimum and/or maximum allowed bitrate. Some encoders extend this method with an average bitrate. The minimum and maximum allowed bitrate set bounds in which the bitrate may vary. The disadvantage of this method is that the average bitrate (and hence file size) will not be known ahead of time. The bitrate range is also used in some fixed quality encoding methods, but usually without permission to change a particular bitrate.

=== Average bitrate ===
The disadvantage of single pass ABR encoding (with or without Constrained Variable Bitrate) is the opposite of fixed quantizer VBR — the size of the output is known ahead of time, but the resulting quality is unknown, although still better than CBR.

The multi-pass ABR encoding is more similar to fixed quantizer VBR, because a higher average will really increase the quality.

=== File size ===
VBR encoding using the file size setting is usually multi-pass encoding. It allows the user to specify a specific target file size. In the first pass, the encoder analyzes the input file and automatically calculates possible bitrate range and/or average bitrate. In the last pass, the encoder distributes the available bits among the entire video to achieve uniform quality.

== See also ==
- Bitrate
- Average bitrate
- Constant bitrate
- Adaptive bitrate streaming
