= OWR =

OWR may stand for:

- Osler–Weber–Rendu disease/syndrome, a genetic disorder associated with abnormal blood vessel formation, see hereditary hemorrhagic telangiectasia;
- Omega West Reactor, an experimental nuclear reactor located at Los Alamos National Laboratory;
- Order of the White Rose of Finland, one of three official orders in Finland;
- OpenWebRTC, a free software stack that implements the WebRTC standard
