= Zetland (newspaper) =

Danish online newspaper

- Screenshot Zetland's iOS app on 24 February 2026
- Website type: Online newspaper
- Available in: Danish
- Founded: 2012
- Headquarters: Copenhagen
- Founders: Jakob Moll; Silke Bock; Hakon Mosbech; Lea Korsgaard
- Editor: Lea Korsgaard
- Employees: 56 (2024)
- Website: www.zetland.dk
- Registration: Yes
- Users: 50,000
- Launched: 23 March 2012; 14 years ago
- Current status: Online

Zetland is a Danish online newspaper focusing on long-form stories and in-depth articles offered in both text and audio formats. It publishes between two and four stories per day, along with a morning news brief and the daily news overview "Helikopter". Some stories are part of a series, while others are standalone.

A subscription-based service, Zetland had more than 50,000 subscribers as of September 2025. The editor-in-chief is Lea Korsgaard, formerly of Berlingske and Politiken, who co-founded Zetland along with Jakob Moll, Silke Bock, and Hakon Mosbech.

The company name derives from a hybrid between a zebra and Shetland pony.

== History ==
Founded in Copenhagen in 2012, Zetland originally created single long-form stories, called e-singles, delivered monthly to subscribers. Journalists would also read their works at public events, similar to Pop-Up Magazine in the U.S.

In 2015, Zetland initiated a relaunch with a crowd-funding campaign which raised over 530,000 kroner, and additional investments of 8 million kroner. The relaunch occurred in March 2016, with Zetland beginning to offer daily news articles. In 2016, revenue was 6.2 million kroner. In 2018 Zetland received funds from the Danish cultural board Slots- og Kulturstyrelse for the first time, totaling 1.8 million kroner.

Since the relaunch, notable pieces have included conversations with Justice Minister Søren Pind and British sociologist Anthony Giddens. In 2017 Zetland won a trio of awards from the Society for News Design Scandinavias, including gold and "Best of Show" in the digital news category for its front page, and silver in the website category.

Zetland achieved financial stability in 2020, with the help of a member-get-member campaign in 2019 that contributed to a 25 percent growth in the span of a month. The campaign was later awarded several awards, including Best Idea to Grow Digital Readership or Engagement from INMA Global Media Awards and Best Digital Marketing Campaign for a News Brand from WAN-IFRA European Digital Media Awards.

In May 2020, former Head of Product Tav Klitgaard replaced co-founder Jakob Moll as CEO, with the latter pursuing academic studies abroad.

In 2023 Zetland launched Good Tape, a speech-to-text transcription tool initially created for internal use that was later spun off as a separate entity.

== Content and membership model ==
The newspaper's editor-in-chief, Lea Korsgaard, has attributed the growth of Zetland to its focus on a membership model, with journalists giving subscribers ("members") a behind-the-scenes look at the journalistic process through their stories and routinely interacting with them in comments sections—and to its constrained number of stories, making the site "finish-able" each day.

Zetland offers all its stories in both text and audio formats, with audio having rapidly become the most popular aspect of the site. In 2018, 60% of users consumed their content as audio.

In 2021, Zetland switched from MP3 to the Opus format for its articles' audio files, attaining a 35 percent reduction in bandwidth and a reduced climate footprint.

== International expansion ==
Co-founder Jakob Moll returned to the company as Development Manager in 2022, before becoming its International Director in October 2023 and leading Zetland's plans for international expansion.

In January 2025, Zetland launched the new online news media Uusi Juttu in Finland following a successful crowdfunding campaign.

In September 2025, the company announced that Bonnier News would buy a majority stake in Zetland and that the company would continue their international expansion under the new ownership.

In February 2026, the proposed Norwegian offshoot Demo successfully passed 5,000 supporters in a similar campaign. At the time, Zetland owned 92.5% of the Norwegian company, with its three Norwegian founders owning the remaining 7.5%. The Norwegian news media is expected to launch in the summer of 2026.
