= QuteCom =

Voice over IP client

- WengoPhone Icon
- Developer: MBDSYS
- Initial release: 25 June 2005
- Final release: 2.2.1 (22 June 2011; 14 years ago) [±]
- Repository: anonscm.debian.org/cgit/pkg-voip/qutecom.git
- Written in: C/C++ Qt
- Operating system: Cross-platform
- Type: VoIP/Instant messaging Service
- License: GPL-2.0-or-later

QuteCom (previously called WengoPhone) was a free-software SIP-compliant VoIP client developed by the QuteCom (previously OpenWengo) community under the GPL-2.0-or-later license. It allows users to speak to other users of SIP-compliant VoIP software at no cost. It also allows users to call landlines and cell phones, send SMS and make video calls. None of these functions are tied to a particular provider, allowing users to choose among any SIP provider.

== History ==
Development on WengoPhone began in September 2004. The first published version was released as version 0.949. A next-generation version of WengoPhone (WengoPhone NG) began development in 2005. The last release of WengoPhone before the change to QuteCom was version 2.1.2. A WengoPhone Firefox plug-in has also been published, which is currently available on Mac OS X and Microsoft Windows, with a Linux version under development.

On 28 January 2008, Wengo, the original sponsor of WengoPhone, transferred the sponsorship of the project to MBDSYS, and it became known as QuteCom.

On 15 May 2008, osAlliance presented kvats as a branded 2.2 version of WengoPhone/QuteCom with the preferred SIP provider A1, a brand of mobilkom Austria.

As of 29 July 2016 the domain qutecom.com is registered with a domain broker. Whois seems to indicate this happened on 30 March 2016.

== Calls ==
PC-to-PC calls have Hi-Fi quality and use several codecs such as iLBC, G.711 (PCMA or PCMU), G.722, AMR (license needed), AMR-WB (license needed), G.729 (license needed). It is possible to start a conversation with other users of the same software or any other software that is SIP-compliant such as Gizmo. QuteCom also allows users to make video calls using FFmpeg. Supported video codec is H.263. Since version 2.1, QuteCom allows IM chats with MSN, YIM, AIM, ICQ and XMPP users. This has been achieved by using the libpurple library.

Concerning calls to landlines, the default server configuration is the one from Wengo, which was the primary sponsor of the OpenWengo project. After the release of version 2.1, QuteCom could be used with any SIP provider. This gives users an economic advantage, as they can choose the SIP provider according to how much the provider charges per minute and not according to the software they use.

== User interface ==
The GUI is similar to those of other VoIP softphones such as Gizmo5 or Skype. From the main GUI, tabs allow access to the contact list, recent calls list, and user account information. Technically, it is written in Python and Qt/C++ programming languages.

== Features ==
The features of QuteCom are:

- SIP compliance
- Provider agnostic
- Allows users to send SMS to France
- NAT traversal
- Cross-platform
- Audio smileys
- Qt-based GUI
- Chatting with MSN, AIM, ICQ, Yahoo and XMPP users
- Encryption via SRTP, but key exchange over Everbee key that is not a Standard
- Uses standard Session Initiation Protocol

== Limitations ==
The main limitations of the QuteCom are:

- Lack of true privacy features such as encryption. A beta AES-128 encryption using SRTP is available since 2.1 version of QuteCom
- Does not support H.261 and sends wrong H.263 packets, preventing communication with other videophones
- Does not support audio conferences with more than three people
- Key Exchange for encryption is not a standard, so it works only between QuteCom clients

== See also ==
- Comparison of VoIP software
- Blink
- Ekiga
- Empathy (software)
- Jitsi
- Wengo SIP Service
