= CU-RTC-WEB =

API definition

Customizable, Ubiquitous Real Time Communication over the Web is an API definition being drafted by Bernard Aboba at Microsoft. It is a competing standard to WebRTC, which drafted by a World Wide Web Consortium working group since May 2011.

As of 2024, CU-RTC-WEB is still in the drafting phase, with ongoing discussions and contributions from various stakeholders in the tech community. Bernard Aboba, who serves as a co-chair of the W3C WebRTC Working Group, is actively involved in both CU-RTC-WEB and WebRTC, indicating a commitment to advancing real-time communication standards across platforms.
