= Wire speed =

Theoratical maximum speed of a network connection

In computer networking, wire speed or wirespeed refers to the hypothetical peak physical layer net bit rate (useful information rate) of a cable (consisting of fiber-optical wires or copper wires) combined with a certain digital communication device, interface, or port. For example, the wire speed of Fast Ethernet is 100 Mbit/s also known as the peak bitrate, connection speed, useful bit rate, information rate, or digital bandwidth capacity. The wire speed is the data transfer rate that a telecommunications standard provides at a reference point between the physical layer and the data link layer.

== Related terms ==
The wire speed should not be confused with the line bitrate, also known as gross bit rate, raw bitrate or data signalling rate, which is 125 Mbit/s in fast Ethernet. In case there is a physical layer overhead, for example due to line coding or error-correcting codes, the line bitrate is higher than the wire speed. The theoretical channel capacity of the cable may be much higher, especially if the cable is short, but this is not utilized in the communication standard. The channel capacity depends on the physical and electrical properties of the cable, while the wire speed also depends on the connection protocols. The wire speed may also refer to maximum throughput, which typically is a couple of percent lower than the physical layer net bit rate in wired networks due to data-link-layer protocol overhead, data packet gaps, etc., and much lower in wireless networks.

== Communicating "at wire speed" ==
The term at wire speed, or the adjective wire speed, describes any computer system or hardware device that is able to achieve a network throughput equal to the maximum throughput of the communication standard. This requires that the CPU capacity, bus capacity, network switching capacity, etc., be sufficient. Network switches, routers, and similar devices are sometimes described as operating at wire speed. Data encryption and decryption and hardware emulation are software functions that might run at wire speed (or close to it) when embedded in a microchip.

The wire speed is rarely achieved in connections between computers due to CPU limitations, disk read/write overhead, or contention for resources. However, it is still a useful concept for estimating the theoretical best throughput and how far the real-life performance falls short of the maximum.

The term wire speed (or wirespeed) is considered a non-formal language term.
