= Wengo =

French telephone advice service

- Genre: Peer-to-peer Internet Telephony
- Website: www.wengo.fr

Wengo was at the beginning of 2004 a subsidiary of French telecom service provider Neuf Cegetel. As of February 2012, Wengo employs 80 people in the Paris headquarters, and is a subsidiary of Vivendi. Wengo is now repositioned as an online personal and consulting services marketplace.

== Voice over IP ==
Wengo was founded in September 2004, launching its service at the beginning of 2005 based on what is now known as the "WengoPhone, classic edition". In September 2005, Wengo opened its visiophony service at the same time as Skype on a cross platform (Windows, Linux and Mac OS X). In 2006, Wengo integrated the Gaim project into its software, allowing its users to communicate via Instant Messaging with other users on the MSN, Yahoo! or Google Talk networks.

Wengo and Skype started offering free PSTN calls in 2006, which accelerated the commoditization of telephony calls. In June 2006, Wengo offered a two-month unlimited calling plan to several destinations including Belgium, Guadeloupe, India, Martinique, Poland and Vietnam. The offer was posted on many websites, including FatWallet, and attracted many new customers. Wengo later suspended many of these accounts, in the company's interests, after many people began abusing the unlimited calling system.

=== WengoPhone ===
Originally, Wengo was supporting the development of WengoPhone. WengoPhone was a free and open source (GPL) VoIP, SMS and chat) softphone through which it offered PC to PSTN phone calls. This software used the free and open SIP protocol, it was developed under the name WengoPhone by the OpenWengo project. Their Firefox browser extension was the first browser-based VoIP client for OS X. The VoIP service was presented on the French market as an attempt to compete with Skype, Yahoo and other virtual network service providers. The economic model of this activity, however, was not sustainable. Wengo decided that WengoPhone was outside its core business, and in February 2008 transferred the project to a partner called MBDSYS — another French startup. WengoPhone and the OpenWengo community have since rebranded themselves as QuteCom.

== Social marketplace ==
In June 2006, Wengo launched a social marketplace that gives its users the opportunity to create toll-free telephone number and paying services so that they can sell their expertise over the phone. This marketplace is the core business of Wengo (no more VoIP activities).

== History ==
2011
November: Wengo experts also answer paid questions (in addition to phone advice)
July: Launch of the iPhone app available on the Apple App Store (in French only)
May: The cumulative number of calls via Wengo exceeds one million calls since the beginning in 2007 (source: call counter in real time)
February: doctors are available by phone via Wengo Health.
2010
September: 1500 Wengo experts now have a blog available from their expert page.
June: in partnership with Acadomia, Wengo provides Online Tutoring, Acadomia Online
January: Opening to content generated by users with the launch of a forum Legal.
2009
Spain and opening Portugal. The sales volume for 2009 is 8 million euros according to the press release of 06/10/2004. In partnership with Universal Music, Wengo launched a music advisory service called MyMusic-Pro.
2008
Wengo claimed a force of 1,500 experts, including 850 experts assets generating an average income of € 500 per month. The sales volume is announced 2 million euros with 50,000 calls. In February 2008, Wengo was able to secure a significant investment of €6 million. The VoIP activity was transferred to a partner called MBDSYS.
2007
Launch of the new site Wengo.fr offering expert advice by phone in the categories Legal, Education, Welfare, Psychology, Business, Finance, Psychics, Leisure, Shopping, Computers. This service was launched in March 2007 by the team that created the WengoPhone. In July 2007, Neuf Cegetel's Board of Directors approved the write off of Wengo's debt for €11 million and, at the same time, agreed that investors should be able to participate in Wengo's capital by means of a reserved increase in capital that could be made by a cash contribution of €12 million.
2006
The software is available Wengophone and a version based on open wengo developed under the name qutecom. In December 2006, Wengo launched wengovisio, a Flash-driven VoIP client that enables website owners to be called by their readers directly on their website, without any software installation.

== See also ==
- List of SIP software
- List of video telecommunication services and product brands
