= Average bitrate =

Average amount of data transferred per unit time

In telecommunications, average bitrate (ABR) refers to the average amount of data transferred per unit of time, usually measured per second, commonly for digital music or video. An MP3 file, for example, that has an average bit rate of 128 kbit/s transfers, on average, 128,000 bits every second. It can have higher bitrate and lower bitrate parts, and the average bitrate for a certain timeframe is obtained by dividing the number of bits used during the timeframe by the number of seconds in the timeframe. Bitrate is not reliable as a standalone measure of audio or video quality, since more efficient compression methods use lower bitrates to encode material at a similar quality.

Average bitrate can also refer to a form of variable bitrate (VBR) encoding in which the encoder will try to reach a target average bitrate or file size while allowing the bitrate to vary between different parts of the audio or video. As it is a form of variable bitrate, this allows more complex portions of the material to use more bits and less complex areas to use fewer bits. However, bitrate will not vary as much as in variable bitrate encoding. At a given bitrate, VBR is usually higher quality than ABR, which is higher quality than CBR (constant bitrate). ABR encoding is desirable for users who want the general benefits of VBR encoding (an optimum bitrate from frame to frame) but with a relatively predictable file size. Two-pass encoding is usually needed for accurate ABR encoding, as on the first pass the encoder has no way of knowing what parts of the audio or video need the highest bitrates to be encoded.

== See also ==
- Variable bitrate
- Constant bitrate
