= Vorbis comment =

Metadata container for Ogg file formats

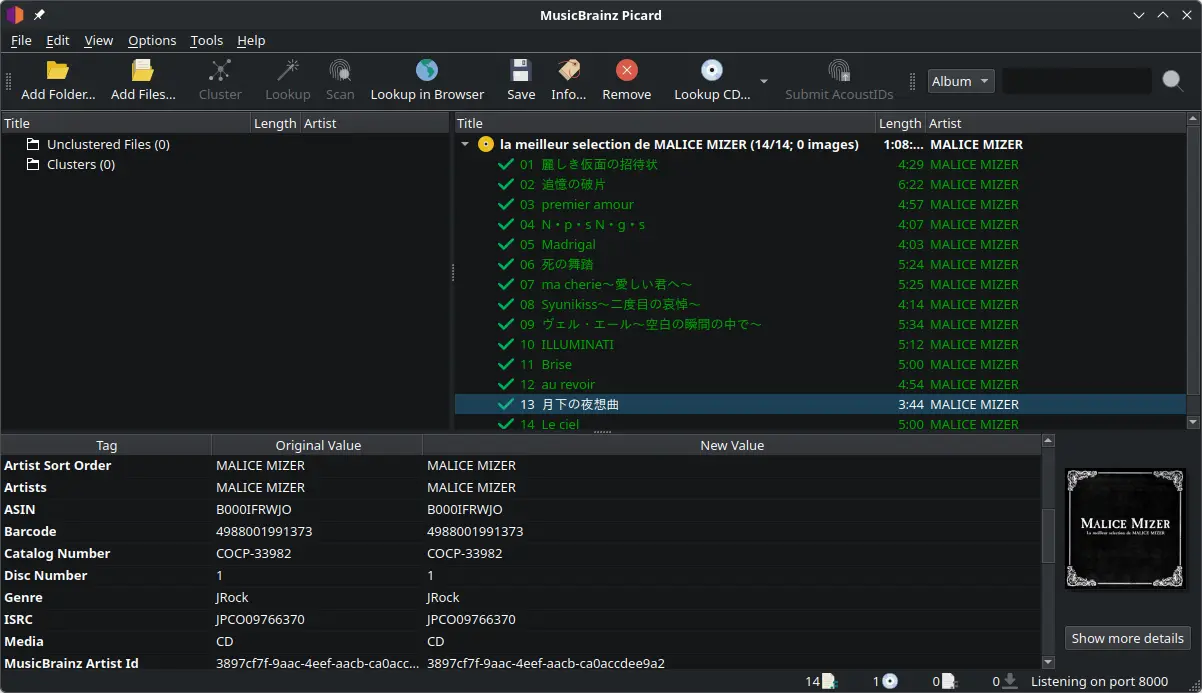
Editing Vorbis comments in MusicBrainz Picard

A Vorbis comment is a metadata container used in the Ogg file format (with Vorbis, FLAC, Theora, Speex and Opus codecs). It allows information such as the title, artist, album, track number or other information about the file to be added to the file itself. However, as the official Ogg Vorbis documentation notes, “[the comment header] is meant for short, text comments, not arbitrary metadata; arbitrary metadata belongs in a separate logical bitstream (usually an XML stream type) that provides greater structure and machine parseability.” Instead, the intended function of Vorbis comments is to approximate the kind of information that might be hand-inked onto a blank faced CD-R or CD-RW: a few lines of notes briefly detailing the content.

== Format ==
A Vorbis tag is a list of fields in the format FieldName=Data. The field name can be composed of printable ASCII characters, 0x20 (space) through 0x7D (‘}’), with 0x3D (‘=’) and 0x7E (‘~’) excluded. It is case insensitive, so artist and ARTIST are the same field.

The number of fields and their length is restricted to 4,294,967,295 (the maximum value of an unsigned 32-bit integer), but most tag editing applications impose stricter limits. FLAC has a smaller limit of 24-bit in a METADATA_BLOCK_VORBIS_COMMENT, because it stores thumbnails and cover art in binary big-endian METADATA_BLOCK_PICTUREs outside of the FLAC tags.

The data is encoded in UTF-8, and so any conforming Unicode string may be used as a value.

Any field name is allowed, and there is no format that the data values must be in. This is in contrast to the ID3 format used for MP3s, which is highly structured. Field names are also permitted to be used more than once. It is encouraged to use this feature to support multiple values, for example two ARTIST=... fields to list both artists of a single composition.

The specification gives several example tag names such as TITLE and TRACKNUMBER. Most applications also support common de facto standards, such as DISCNUMBER, RATING, and tags for ReplayGain information. Ratings are usually mapped as 1-5 stars with 20,40,60,80,100 as the actual string values.

There are no provisions for storing binary data in Vorbis comments. This is by design; they are intended to be used as part of a container format such as Ogg, and any additional binary data should be encoded into the container as a stream. The exception to this, by popular request, is a proposal to incorporate cover art into a Vorbis comment.

== Example ==
Here is an example of set of Vorbis comments taken from an Opus audio format file:

DATE=2025-10-03 
TITLE=Bathys=Entropic=RaptureForm=Correlation=QX512 
ENCODER=fre:ac v1.1.7 
ALBUMARTIST=deepspace 
ARTIST=deepspace 
ALBUM=Water Planets 
REPLAYGAIN_ALBUM_GAIN=-4.12 dB 
REPLAYGAIN_TRACK_GAIN=-3.25 dB 
COMMENT=Visit https://projektrecords.bandcamp.com 
TRACKNUMBER=2 
REPLAYGAIN_ALBUM_PEAK=1.000000 
REPLAYGAIN_TRACK_PEAK=0.780273 
MUSICBRAINZ_RELEASEGROUPID=6ec9bbc8-c785-49ff-9ff1-e32cdd3b44ef 
ORIGINALDATE=2025-10-03 
ORIGINALYEAR=2025 
RELEASETYPE=album 
MUSICBRAINZ_ALBUMID=316350b3-8a91-44be-b5c9-0b842df747e8 
RELEASESTATUS=official 
BARCODE=617026234724 
LABEL=Projekt: Archive 
CATALOGNUMBER=ARC00347 
SCRIPT=Latn 
RELEASECOUNTRY=XW 
MUSICBRAINZ_ALBUMARTISTID=c173e3f6-2af3-4b77-b9d8-a002b7b024f6 
ALBUMARTISTSORT=Deepspace 
TOTALDISCS=1 
DISCNUMBER=1 
MEDIA=Digital Media 
TOTALTRACKS=22 
MUSICBRAINZ_TRACKID=4a822bc0-07e2-416b-96a2-0af121f02b2b 
MUSICBRAINZ_ARTISTID=c173e3f6-2af3-4b77-b9d8-a002b7b024f6 
ARTISTSORT=Deepspace 
ARTISTS=deepspace 
MUSICBRAINZ_RELEASETRACKID=61d80392-e05f-4b26-ac83-d03a86bb97ba 
TRACKTOTAL=22 
DISCTOTAL=1 
METADATA_BLOCK_PICTURE= <binary output of cover art>

== See also ==
- APEv2 tag
- ID3
- CD-Text
