= Gizmo5 =

Peer-to-peer internet telephony and instant messaging software application

- Original author: SIPphone
- Developer: Google
- Release: July 2005; 21 years ago (as SIPphone)
- Final release: 4.0.5.400 (Windows) November 12, 2009; 17 years ago, 4.0.0.269 (Mac) September 23, 2009; 17 years ago, 3.1.0.79 (Linux) November 29, 2007; 18 years ago
- Operating system: Mac OS X, Linux, Windows, Internet Tablet OS, Symbian
- Type: Peer-to-peer internet telephony
- License: Freeware
- Website: www.gizmovoice.com (Discontinued)

Gizmo5 (formerly known as Gizmo Project and SIPphone) was a voice over IP communications network and a proprietary freeware soft phone for that network. On November 12, 2009, Google announced that it had acquired Gizmo5. On March 4, 2011, Google announced that the service would be discontinued as of April 3, 2011.

The Gizmo5 network used open standards for call management, Session Initiation Protocol (SIP) and Extensible Messaging and Presence Protocol (XMPP). However, the Gizmo5 client application was proprietary software and used several proprietary codecs, including GIPS and Internet Speech Audio Codec (iSAC).

== History ==
Gizmo Project was founded by Michael Robertson and his company SIPphone.

On November 12, 2009, Google announced that it had acquired Gizmo5 for a reported $30 million in cash. Prior to this acquisition, Gizmo5 had a working relationship with GrandCentral (now Google Voice) for years. Upon announcement, Gizmo5 suspended new signups until a Google relaunch. Google was also dogfooding a Google Voice desktop client based on Gizmo5, branded as Gizmo5 by Google.

On April 3, 2011, Google shut down Gizmo5 and recommended users to use Google Talk instead.

== Technology ==
Gizmo5 was based on the Session Initiation Protocol and could interoperate with other SIP-based networks directly, including the public switched telephone network. The latter required the Gizmo5 service features CallOut and CallIn. CallOut was available at a fee, whereas CallIn and calls to other VoIP users were generally free of cost. Gizmo5 also used encryption (Secure Real-time Transport Protocol) for network calls and worked well with Phil Zimmermann's Zfone security features.

Gizmo5 supported the following Codecs:

- GSM — fixed bit rate, not loss tolerant, narrowband (8 kHz sampling rate)
- PCMA — fixed bit rate (8 kHz sampling rate)
- PCMU — fixed bit rate (8 kHz sampling rate, high band width)
- EG711 (Enhanced G.711) — fixed bit rate, loss tolerant, narrowband
- iSAC — variable bit rate, loss tolerant, narrow and wideband (8 to 16 kHz)
- iLBC — variable bit rate, loss tolerant, narrow
- iPCMwb — 16 kHz sampling rate
- iPCM — fixed bit rate, loss tolerant, wideband

Version 4.0 of the Gizmo5 softphone offered video calls. Gizmo5 also offered smartphone version.

As of July 20, 2009, Gizmo5 was the only SIP service that could be used with Google Voice directly (without requiring a U.S. based phone number).

The text chat function of Gizmo5 utilized the Extensible Messaging and Presence Protocol (XMPP) protocol. Users were addressed by an identification string in the format of username@chat.gizmoproject.com.

An earlier incarnation of the service was PhoneGaim, a free software VoIP system based on the Pidgin instant messaging software and the SIP protocol handling of the Linphone VoIP software, but restricted to using (only) the SIPphone service. It is available under the GNU General Public License and sponsored by Linspire.

== Service features ==
Gizmo5 supported outbound caller line identification in the United States.

Gizmo5 provided a free voicemail service.

Gizmo5 allowed paying subscribers of LiveJournal to place voiceposts if they are unable to use the voicepost telephone lines provided by the website.

== Mobile phone support ==
The Gizmo5 mobile phone application used the phone's carrier voice network for all calls. The service called the phone numbers of both parties and bridged the call. On mobile phones that support SIP applications, calls may be placed over WiFi or 3G. In the case of WiFi, calls to Gizmo5 users were free, and calls to the public switched telephone network were charged Gizmo5 Call Out credit. On 3G, additional costs would apply depending on the user's data plan.

== Gmail ==
On August 26, 2010, Gmail accounts with Google voice were given a function to make and receive calls. Google Voice product manager, Vincent Paquet, confirmed that this function was added through the help of the technology received after the Gizmo5 acquisition.

== Service Terminated ==
On Fri, Mar 4, 2011, subscribers received the following message from Gizmo5, indicating that the service would be terminated.

"Gizmo5 is writing to let you know that we will no longer be providing service starting on April 3, 2011. A week from today, March 11, 2011, you will no longer be able to add credit to your account.

Although the standalone Gizmo5 client will no longer be available, we have since launched the ability to call phones from within Gmail at even more affordable rates.

If you purchased calling credit and have a balance remaining in your account, you can request a refund by logging into http://my.gizmo5.com. If you are in the United States, you can instead choose to transfer your credit to a Google Voice account, so it can be used for calling from Google Voice or Gmail. If you don't have a Google Voice account, please create one so that we can transfer your credit.

Please request a call credit transfer or refund by April 3, 2011. If you don't request a call credit transfer or refund by this date, we will automatically refund your remaining call credit via the payment method you originally used to purchase the credit....

There was no indication made if the service would be revived in another form, or if there would be similar functionality added to any of Google's current telephony offerings. On the morning of April 4, service was finally cut.

== See also ==
- Comparison of VoIP software
- List of XMPP client software
- Ekiga
- QuteCom
- Google Voice
