= SVOPC =

Audio compression standard

SVOPC (Sinusoidal Voice Over Packet Coder) is a compression method for audio which is used by VoIP applications. It is a lossy speech compression codec designed specifically towards communication channels suffering from packet loss. It uses more bandwidth than best bandwidth-optimised codecs, but it is packet loss resistant instead.

Skype Limited developed a codec called 'SVOPC' for Skype. It was first used in Skype 3.2 beta 53, released on March 28, 2007. Starting with Skype 4.0, SVOPC is replaced by SILK.

== Technical information ==
Operation is quasi-harmonic modelling of the linear prediction residual.

The codec uses a 16 kHz sample rate and allows for 8 kHz of audio bandwidth. SVOPC provides synthesized speech of good subjective quality at around 20 kbit/s.

Because the compression relies on floating point mathematics it can be inefficient when it's running in an embedded system as this will likely not offer the same kind of floating point capabilities as, say, a PC. The new codec SILK has been designed with this in mind.

== See also ==
- Skype protocol
- Comparison of audio coding formats

== Sources ==
- Dryburghon, L. - "Interview with Jonathan Christensen, General Manager of Skype, about SVOPC Audio"
- Lindblom, J. (2005). "A sinusoidal voice over packet coder tailored for the frame-erasure channel". IEEE Transactions on Speech and Audio Processing. 13 (5): 787–798. Bibcode:2005ITSAP..13..787L. doi:10.1109/TSA.2005.851913. S2CID 1361385.
- Stanford, M. - "Skype’s new super-wideband codec"
