= Line2 =

American telecommunications company

Line2, Inc.
- Type: Private
- Industry: Telecom, VOIP
- Genre: Telecommunications Service Providers; Cloud-Based SaaS (Software as a Service)
- Founded: 2008; 18 years ago
- Founder: Peter Sisson
- Headquarters: San Francisco, California, United States
- Number of locations: US, Canada
- Area served: Wi-Fi hot-spots, 4G/3G or Cellular enabled calls
- Products: Line2 Standard, Line2 Pro iPhone app Android app
- Services: Domestic & Long Distance, International VoIP Provider
- Website: line2.com

Line2 (formerly Toktumi) is a telecommunications company founded in San Francisco in 2008 by Peter Sisson. The company is best known for Line2 apps, which provides Wi-Fi support for mobile phones and multiple devices in lieu of using the service provider.

== Line2 ==
Line2 is a Virtual PBX phone service that allows companies to develop and maintain multiple internal phone lines to handle multiple external calls. Line2 uses cloud computing to allow one phone call to go to shared receivers, such as cell phones or fax machines, depending on which is more appropriate. Line2 allows for such transfers without any special equipment, performing the same function as many other standard office phone systems. Line2 is priced on a monthly or yearly basis, as well as a limited functionality free version.

Line2 works by providing a single number, used by the employer, which can then be used by the employees, avoiding higher rates by allowing them to use one number as opposed to many of them. This also allows employees to receive calls even when not in the workplace.

== Line2 Features ==
The Line2 service provides options that allow it to perform some functions:

- Toll Free Number: the ability to choose a toll free number instead of a local number. Customers are able to send and receive texts to and from their toll free number.
- Call Handling: the use of an "auto attendant" as well as a standard voicemail program. The auto attendant allows the user to record a custom message before their call is rerouted to the appropriate destination. However, this feature does not allow nested menus. The options presented in the first menu are only programmed to lead to other destinations, not to separate menus with separate options. Additionally, the user can choose for a computerized message to play. The caller identifies his or herself, after which the receiver can take the call or direct it to a voicemail system. Finally, users can choose to record their calls if they desire, after which they can send it to a destination of their choosing.
- Address Book: Users have two ways in which to manage contacts within the Line2 Pro service, either manually input a list of contacts into the Line2 or submit Outlook databases of their contact lists to the same site. Line2 Pro also utilizes a type of "dial-by-name" function wherein users can input a contact's name instead of number.
- Teleconferencing: Users can hold telephone conferences with up to 20 people at once. The interface allows speakers to be put on hold in order to add new participants as needed. Participants are not added simultaneously, and must be added one at a time before they join the conference.

== Mobile apps ==
Line2 also offers a mobile app for Apple iOS and Android phones called Line2. Line2 is a mobile VoIP app, which means that, although it is on a mobile device, it uses an Internet Protocol address to make calls. This results in cheaper, sometimes stronger service. It provides similar service to applications like Skype, which also allow users to place calls over the Internet for a smaller fee than using a regular phone line. Calls can be made over Wi-Fi, a 3G or 4G phone network, or cellular voice connections.

Line2 also gives users two lines; one for business, the other for personal calls. It allows the user to choose between a data network or wi-fi hotspots to transmit calls. A user, for instance, could redirect an incoming call over to their second phone line without interrupting their current call. The app also allows for unlimited texting for all numbers including toll free numbers in Canada and the United States.

=== Controversy ===
==== App store recall ====
The Line2 app was submitted to the Apple App Store on June 5, 2009. It was developed with the goal of providing users with two different phone lines. One would be a personal line, the other used for business. This would allow users to keep any personal numbers private, as well as applying professional business features to the other line. It pended approval until June 23, 2009, when Apple rejected the application. Apple later stated to the company that "the application had been rejected because it required people to pay through its website rather than Apple's subscription services that are integrated with the iPhone 3.0 update." Toktumi reported that Salesforce.com allowed sales of apps through the web, but changed the app to work with the App Store.

Toktumi resubmitted the app as a demo on July 13, 2009, when Apple told them to wait a few days for testing before it could be released. However, Apple soon pulled all apps related to Google Voice, giving the reason that Voice duplicated features offered by the iPhone. Line2 was included in this recall because its two-line setup was similar to Google Voice. It also included several features shared by the iPhone.

On September 2, 2009, Apple approved of the Line2 app, which was added to the App Store almost three months after it was originally submitted.

==== Hacking attempt ====
On March 24, 2010, David Pogue reviewed the Line2 app for the New York Times "State of the Art" column. Later on in the day, the app was removed from the App Store. After receiving complaints that the article alerted AT&T to the app, causing them to pull it, CEO Peter Sisson later revealed that Toktumi had suffered a DDoS attack. He pulled the app in order to prevent new customers from having a bad experience as well as taking down the free trial to prevent further problems. A week after the situation, the app was back up for $0.99 on the app store with the free trial reinstated.
