= Core Audio Format =

Audio file format

- Filename extension: .caf
- Internet media type: audio/x-caf
- Type code: caff
- Uniform Type Identifier (UTI): com.apple.coreaudio-format
- Magic number: caff (ASCII)
- Developed by: Apple Inc.
- Initial release: 2005
- Type of format: media container
- Container for: digital audio
- Website: Apple Core Audio Format Specification 1.0

The Core Audio Format is a container format for storing audio, developed by Apple Inc. It is compatible with Mac OS X 10.4 and higher; Mac OS X 10.3 needs QuickTime 7 to be installed.

Core Audio Format is designed to overcome limitations of older digital audio formats, including AIFF and WAV. Just like the QuickTime .mov container, a .caf container can contain many different audio formats, metadata tracks, and much more data. Like the RF64, it is not limited to a 4 GB file size and a single .caf file can theoretically save hundreds of years of recorded audio due to its use of 64-bit file offsets.

GarageBand, Soundtrack Pro, and Logic Studio use the .caf format for their loop and sound effects library, particularly for surround-sound audio compressed with the Apple Lossless (ALAC) codec. It is also what is used to send Audio Messages over iMessage on iOS and macOS.

A CAF file begins with a file header whose first four bytes are the file type caff, followed by a 16-bit version (1 for the current specification) and 16-bit flags; all fields are big-endian.
