= Global IP Solutions =

Company

- Type: Private; acquired by Google Inc. in 2010
- Industry: VoIP, videoconferencing
- Founded: 1999
- Defunct: 2011
- Headquarters: San Francisco, California
- Products: Voice processing engines video processing engines
- Website: www.gipscorp.com

Global IP Solutions (also known as GIPS) was a United States–based corporation that developed real-time voice and video processing software for IP networks, before it was acquired by Google in May 2010. The company delivered embedded software that enabled real-time communications capabilities for video and voice over IP (VoIP). GIPS was perhaps best known for developing the narrowband iLBC and wideband iSAC speech codecs.

GIPS software was generally delivered as “engines” that packaged together voice and video processing components for smoother integration and better performance. GIPS’ customers are primarily service providers, application developers, and manufacturers of IP phones, gateways or voice and video conferencing systems.

== History ==
The company (formerly known as Global IP Sound) was founded in July 1999 in Stockholm, Sweden, by signal processing experts Roar Hagen (then GIPS’ CTO) and Bastiaan Kleijn (then GIPS’ Chief Scientist), Espen Fjogstad and Ivar T. Hognestad. The founders recognized that, at the time, most VoIP technology had been developed for circuit switched networks, and were therefore not suited to handle the network delay, jitter and packet loss presented by IP networks.

In May 2010, Google bought GIPS for $68.2 million. In June 2011, Google released WebRTC, a proposed standard for pluginless peer-to-peer audiovisual communication between browsers, with GIPS technology.
