= Reference implementation =

Implementation of a specification which serves as an example

In the software development process, a reference implementation (or, less frequently, sample implementation or model implementation) is a program that implements all requirements from a corresponding specification. The reference implementation often accompanies a technical standard, and demonstrates what should or what must (Note: MUST according to the RFC 2119) be considered the "correct" behavior of any other implementation of it.

== Characteristics and examples ==
Reference implementations of algorithms, for instance cryptographic algorithms, are often the result or the input of standardization processes. In this function they are often dedicated to the public domain with their source code as public domain software. Examples are the first CERN's httpd, Serpent cipher, base64 variants, and SHA-3. The Openwall Project maintains a list of several algorithms with their reference source code in the public domain.

A reference implementation may or may not be production quality. For example, the Fraunhofer reference implementation of the MP3 standard usually does not compare favorably to other common implementations, such as LAME, in listening tests that determine sound quality. In contrast, CPython, the reference implementation of the Python programming language, is also the implementation most widely used in production.

== Testing ==
Testing the implementation-vs-specification relationship further enhances the production's inter-process efficiencies:

A reference implementation is, in general, an implementation of a specification to be used as a definitive interpretation for that specification. During the development of the ... conformance test suite, at least one relatively trusted implementation of each interface is necessary to (1) discover errors or ambiguities in the specification, and (2) validate the correct functioning of the test suite.

Characteristics of a Reference Implementation:

1. Developed concurrently with the specification and test suite;
2. Verifies that specification is implementable;
3. Enables the test suite to be tested;
4. Serves as a Gold Standard against which other implementations can be measured;
5. Helps to clarify the intent of the specification in situations where conformance tests are inadequate
