= High-resolution audio =

Audio exceeding CD capability

Certification badges for products meeting JEITA/JAS's Hi-Res Audio specifications.

High-resolution audio is a term for music files with bit depth greater than 16-bit and sampling frequency higher than 44.1 kHz or 48 kHz used in CD and DVD formats. The Audio Engineering Society (AES), Consumer Technology Association (CTA) and Japan Audio Society (JAS) set 24-bit/96 kHz as the minimum requirement to fulfill the standard. The Recording Academy Producers & Engineers Wing also cites 24-bit/96 kHz as the preferred resolution for tracking, mixing and mastering audio. In 2011, the Library of Congress chose 24-bit/96 kHz as the "international standard" for archiving and preserving its collection of historical recordings. It is supported by media formats such as DVD-Audio, DualDisc and High Fidelity Pure Audio, download stores like Bandcamp, HDtracks and Qobuz, and streaming platforms including Apple Music, Amazon Music and Tidal. Research into high-resolution audio began in the late 1980s and recordings were made available on the consumer market in 1996.

Other bit depth/sample rate combinations that are often marketed as "high-resolution" include 1-bit/2.8224 MHz (DSD), 20-bit/44.1 kHz (HDCD), 24-bit/44.1, 88.2 or 176.4 kHz, 24-bit/48, 96 or 192 kHz, and 24-bit/352.8 kHz (DXD). Reference-grade digital-to-analog converters that oversample to very high rates such as 24-bit/384 kHz, 32-bit/384 kHz and 32-bit/768 kHz are also available for both consumer and professional use. Sony's LDAC, Dolby's Digital Plus and Lenbrook's MQA are marketed as "hi-res", however, these codecs employ lossy compression and can often have lower bit rates than Compact Disc Digital Audio, and thus, cannot be classified as "true high-resolution."

== Definitions ==
Approximate dynamic range and bandwidths of some high-resolution audio formats

High-resolution audio is generally used to refer to audio files that have a higher sample rate and/or bit depth than that of Compact Disc Digital Audio (CD-DA), which operates at 44.1 kHz/16-bit.

The Recording Industry Association of America (RIAA), in cooperation with the Consumer Electronics Association, DEG: The Digital Entertainment Group, and The Recording Academy Producers & Engineers Wing, formulated the following definition of high-resolution audio in June 2014: "lossless audio capable of reproducing the full spectrum of sound from recordings which have been mastered from better than CD quality music sources which represent what the artists, producers and engineers originally intended."

File formats capable of storing high-resolution audio include FLAC, ALAC, WAV, AIFF, MQA and DSD (the format used by SACD).

== History ==
Super Audio CD logo

DVD-Audio logo

One of the first attempts to market high-resolution audio was High Definition Compatible Digital in 1995, an encoding/decoding technique using standard CD audio. This was followed by two more optical disc formats claiming sonic superiority over CD-DA: SACD in 1999, and DVD-Audio in 2000. These formats offer additional benefits such as multi-channel surround sound. Following a format war, none of these achieved widespread adoption.

Following the rise in online music retailing at the start of the 21st century, high-resolution audio downloads were introduced by HDtracks starting in 2008.

Further attempts to market high-resolution audio on optical disc followed with Pure Audio Blu-ray in 2009, and High Fidelity Pure Audio in 2013. Competition in online high-resolution audio retail stepped-up in 2014 with the announcement of Neil Young's Pono service.

In 2014, the Japan Electronics and Information Technology Industries Association (JEITA) announced a specification and accompanying "Hi-Res Audio" logo for consumer audio products, administered by the Japan Audio Society (JAS). The standard sets minimums of 96 kHz sample rate and 24-bit depth, and for analog processes, 40 kHz or higher. The related "Hi-Res Audio Wireless" standard certifies lossy audio codecs that meet the standard for high-resolution audio; Currently only LDAC, LHDC, LC3plus, MQair, SHDC, and aptX Adaptive are certified. Sony reaffirmed its commitment to development in the high-resolution audio segment by offering a slew of Hi-Res Audio products. A "Hi-Res Audio Wireless" capable audio device is not mandatory to implement AAC codec with Bluetooth.

== Streaming services ==
As of 2021, some music streaming services such as Tidal, Qobuz, Amazon Music, and Apple Music have options to enable the playback of high-resolution audio files.

== Controversy ==
Whether there is any benefit to high-resolution audio over CD-DA is controversial, with some sources claiming sonic superiority:

- "The DSD process used for producing SACDs captures more of the nuances from a performance and reproduces them with a clarity and transparency not possible with CD."—The Mariinsky record label of the Mariinsky Ballet (formerly Kirov Ballet), St. Petersburg, Russia, that sells Super Audio CDs (SACDs)
- "The claimed main-benefit of high-resolution audio files is superior sound quality [...] 24-bit/96 kHz or 24-bit/192 kHz files should, therefore, more closely replicate the sound quality that the musicians and engineers were working with in the studio."—What Hi-Fi?
- "...music professionals with access to first generation data have widely reported subjectively better sound, and a meta-analysis of previously published listening tests comparing high resolution to CD found a clear, though small, audible difference that significantly increased when the listening tests included standard training (i.e., with experience in listening)."—Journal of the Audio Engineering Society

...and with other opinions ranging from skeptical to highly critical:

- "If [the music business] cared about sound quality in the first place, they would make all of the releases sound great in every format they sell: MP3, FLAC, CD, iTunes, or LP."—CNET
- "Impractical overkill that nobody can afford"—Gizmodo
- "A solution to a problem that doesn't exist, a business model based on willful ignorance and scamming people."—Xiph.org

Business magazine Bloomberg Businessweek suggests that caution is in order with regard to high-resolution audio: "There is reason to be wary, given consumer electronics companies' history of pushing advancements whose main virtue is to require everyone to buy new gadgets."

High-resolution files that are downloaded from niche websites that cater to audiophile listeners often include different mastering in the release – thus many comparisons of CD to these releases are evaluating differences in mastering, rather than bit depth.

Most early papers using blind listening tests concluded that differences are not audible by the sample of listeners taking the test. Blind tests have shown that musicians and composers are unable to distinguish higher resolutions from 16-bit audio at 48 kHz. One 2014 paper showed that dithering using outdated methods (Note: Rectangular unshaped dither, rather than the industry-standard triangular or shaped dither.) produces audible artifacts in blind listening tests.

Joshua Reiss performed a meta-analysis on 20 of published tests, saying that trained listeners could distinguish between hi-resolution recordings and their CD equivalents under blind conditions. In a paper published in the July 2016 issue of the AES Journal, Reiss says that, although the individual tests had mixed results, and that the effect was "small and difficult to detect," the overall result was that trained listeners could distinguish between high-resolution recordings and their CD equivalents under blind conditions: "Overall, there was a small but statistically significant ability to discriminate between standard-quality audio (44.1 or 48 kHz, 16 bit) and high-resolution audio (beyond standard quality). When subjects were trained, the ability to discriminate was far more significant." Hiroshi Nittono pointed out that the results in Reiss's paper showed that the ability to distinguish hi resolution audio from CD quality audio "was only slightly better than chance".

Some technical explanations for sonic superiority cite the improved time domain impulse response of the anti-aliasing filter allowed by higher sample rates. This reduces the energy spread in time from transient signals such as plucking a string or striking a cymbal.

== See also ==
- High fidelity
- Loudness war
