= LDAC (codec) =

Digital audio encoding technology

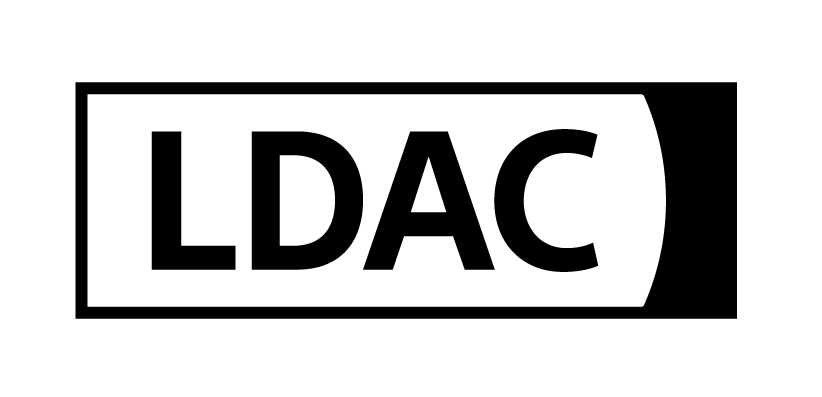
- Developed by: Sony
- Type of format: Audio codec

LDAC is a proprietary, lossy audio coding technology developed by Sony, designed for streaming audio over Bluetooth connections at up to 990 kbps at 32 bits/96 kHz (high-resolution audio quality). It is used by various products, including headphones, earphones, smartphones, portable media players, active speakers, and home theaters.

The encoder of LDAC is open-source under Apache License 2.0, so that any device can be coded to transmit LDAC streams without patent or licensing issues. The decoder design remains proprietary.

== Audio coding ==
LDAC is an alternative to Bluetooth SIG's SBC codec. Its main competitors are Huawei's L2HC, Qualcomm's aptX-HD/aptX Adaptive and the HWA Union/Savitech's LHDC.

LDAC is a streaming only ATRAC9 variant. By default, LDAC audio bitrate settings are set to Best Effort, which switches between discrete bitrate steps (CBR) 330/660/990 kbps depending on connection strength; however, audio bitrate and resolution can be manually adjusted on Linux (when using PipeWire), some Android platforms (which generally requires access to the "Developer Settings" menu), and Sony's own smartphones and Walkman devices at the following rates; 330/660/990 kbps at 96/48 kHz and 303/606/909 kbps at 88.2/44.1 kHz with depth of 32, 24 or 16 bits.

Starting from Android 8.0 "Oreo", LDAC is part of the Android Open Source Project, enabling every OEM to integrate this standard into their own Android devices freely. The encoder library is open source and the implementation for Linux is already present in bluez-alsa, pulseaudio-modules-bt, and in PipeWire's bluez5 module. It is available on Fedora since Fedora 29. However the decoder library is proprietary, so receiving devices require licenses, but the decoder Sony code became available in 2025.

On 17 September 2019, the Japan Audio Society (JAS) certified LDAC with their Hi-Res Audio Wireless certification. As of June 2024, the codecs certified by the JAS to bear the Hi-Res Audio Wireless logo are LHDC, LDAC, SCL6, LC3plus, SHDC, and aptX Adaptive.

Currently LDAC is still not supported by iOS, iPadOS, macOS and Windows. In macOS and Windows, an additional Bluetooth audio transmitter that supports LDAC can be used, but a special driver from manufacturer is required for LDAC. On Apple and Microsoft operating systems, the AAC wireless codec can be used as a fallback codec.

== See also ==
- Lossy data compression
- List of codecs
