= LHDC (codec) =

Audio compression format

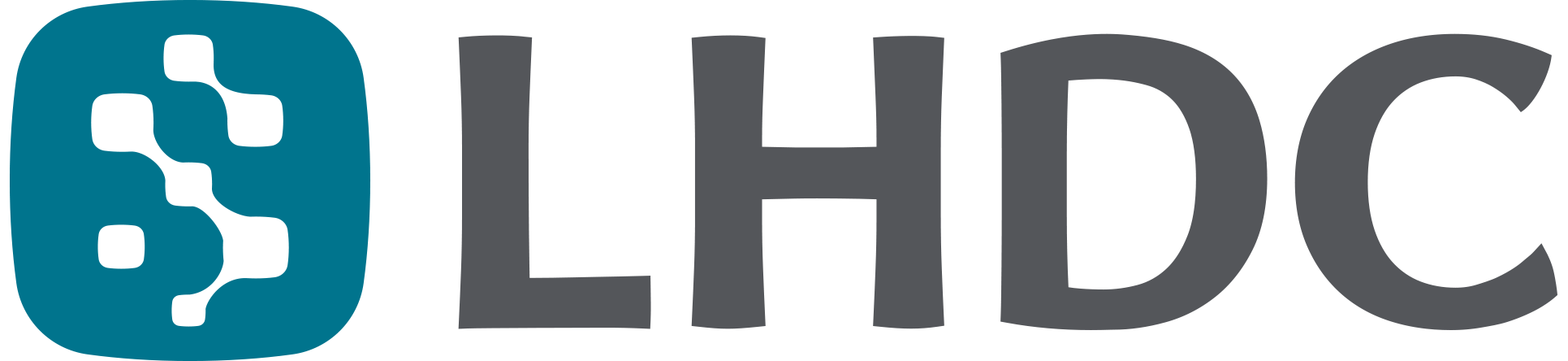
- Developed by: Savitech
- Type of format: Audio codec
- Website: www.lhdc.co

Low Latency High-Definition Audio Codec (LHDC) is an audio codec technology developed by Savitech. LHDC allows high-resolution audio streaming over Bluetooth. It is a high-quality Bluetooth codec based on the A2DP Bluetooth protocol and allows a bit-rate of up to 1000 kbps compared to SBC's bit rate of 345 kbps.

LHDC is an alternative to Bluetooth SIG's SBC and LC3 codecs. Its main competitors are Qualcomm's aptX HD/aptX Adaptive, Huawei 's L2HC and Sony's LDAC codec.

Starting from Android 10, enumeration constant symbols for LHDC and LLAC are part of the Android Open Source Project, enabling every OEM to integrate this standard into their own Android devices freely. Older versions of Android require LHDC/LLAC enumeration constant symbols to be implemented by the smartphone manufacturers or Android app. Android apps with this type of LHDC support include Savitech's Hi-Res BT Player, FiiO Music, HIFIMAN Music and DA&T Audio. Android 17 added native support for LHDC v5.

== LHDC ==
LHDC supports bitrates of 160–1000 kbps, bit-depth of up to 24 bit and sample rate of up to 192 kHz.

The first smartphone to support LHDC was the Huawei Mate 10.

On 17 September 2019, the Japan Audio Society (JAS) certified LHDC with their Hi-Res Audio Wireless certification. As of June 2024, the codecs certified by the JAS to bear the Hi-Res Audio Wireless logo are LHDC, LDAC, SCL6, LC3plus, SHDC, and aptX Adaptive.

== LLAC ==
Low Latency Audio Codec (LLAC) is also called LHDC LL. It is based on the high definition wireless audio technology from LHDC, but designed for low latency and features an auto-detect gaming mode. Savitech claims LLAC has end-to-end latency of around ~30 ms. LLAC supports bitrates of 400/600 kbit/s, bit-depth of up to 24 bit and sample rate of up to 48 kHz. LLAC has no hardware requirement for the transmitter.

The first smartphone to support LLAC was the Huawei P30.

== LHDC versioning ==
LHDC codec have separated in multiples' versions, each version uses a "v" suffix to indicate it version, LHDC's latest version is LHDCv5, this version has included support to 1MB/s max transmission rate, and brings first support to 24/192khz Hi-Res quality.

== Hi-Res Wireless Audio (HWA) Union ==
On 2 September 2018 the Hi-Res Wireless Audio (HWA) Union was formed to promote LHDC adoption. Also known as the HWA Alliance. The HWA Union Board of Directors includes:

- AKM
- China Electronics Technology Group Corporation
- Cirrus Logic
- Edifier
- Guoguang Electric
- HiFiMAN
- HiVi
- Huawei
- Institute of Acoustics of the Chinese Academy of Sciences
- Savitech
- iriver
- Sennheiser
- Taihe Music Group

Other HWA Union members include:

- ams AG
- Astell & Kern
- Audio-Technica
- Aukey
- Cayin
- Cozoy
- Coolhere
- Colorfly
- DA&T
- DA-ART
- DUNU
- FiiO
- Fostex
- Haylou
- HiBy
- infly
- iEAST
- Liesheng
- Musiland
- NFJ FX-AUDIO
- OC Studio
- Onkyo
- Pioneer
- ProStereo
- QCY
- Questyle Audio
- Quloos (QLS HiFi)
- Radius
- Shanling
- S.M.S.L
- TASCAM
- TEAC
- TempoTec
- Tecsun
- TiinLab
- Topping
- Tube Fan Audio
- VMN
- xDuoo
- YULONG Audio
- 1MORE

== HWA Certification ==
On March 27, 2018, Huawei and Savitech announced the Hi-Res Wireless Audio (HWA) Certification. Platinum HWA Certification requires frequency response over 40 kHz, THD+N<-90 dB, SNR>110 dB, and playback of at least 24-bit/96 kHz. Gold HWA Certification requires frequency response over 20 kHz, THD+N<-80 dB, SNR>100 dB, and playback of at least 24-bit/48 kHz.

== See also ==
- List of codecs
- Lossy data compression
