= Huawei Premia =

Android smartphone offered by MetroPCS

Huawei Premia 4G M931 is an Android smartphone offered by MetroPCS. Huawei Premia 4G M931 features Android 4.0

== Overview ==
Huawei Premia 4G M931 Metro comes as an innovated smart-phone introduced by MtroPCS to add to its line-up of cheap 4G LTE handsets. Priced at $149.99, the M931 runs Ice Cream Sandwich. The smart-Phone Huawei Premia 4G M931 phone is featured with a 4inch display with 800 x 480 pixels and Corning Gorilla Glass. Other highlights include: Wi-Fi, DLNA, GPS, Bluetooth, Rhapsody Music Unlimited, 1.3MP front-facing camera, 5MP rear camera with LED flash and 720p video recording, dual-core 1.5GHz Processor, 1GB of RAM, and MicroSD card support.

== See also ==
- List of Android devices
- Smartphone
