= Android lawn statues =

Series of public artworks in Mountain View, California

- The Android lawn statues in 2015
- Medium: Sculpture
- Location: Mountain View, California; 37°25′14″N 122°05′00″W
- Owner: Google

The Android lawn statues are a series of large foam statues near the Googleplex (Google's headquarters) in Mountain View, California, currently located at Charleston Rd & Huff Ave. They are based on the code names for versions of Google's Android mobile operating system, which were named after desserts and sweet treats. Google used to commission a statue for each new Android version, a tradition that ended in 2019 with the release of Android 10. Starting with Android 11, the statues are created as virtual 3D models.

These statues were originally located in front of Building 44, where the Android development team had its offices, before being moved to their present location a few blocks away next to the Google Visitor Center Beta. The area is open to Google employees and their guests, and visitors are encouraged to take photos.

Up to 2013's KitKat, all the sculptures were made by the company Themendous, previously known as Custom Creations.

== Background ==
Google's Android is the fastest selling mobile operating system as of late 2010 and was developed as a partnership with the Open Handset Alliance, with version 1.0 being released on September 23, 2008. The first publicly codenamed version of Android was "Cupcake" which was released on April 27, 2009. Versions 1.0 and 1.1 did not have codenames following this scheme. There was initially a plan to use famous robot names in alphabetical order, and some early interim revisions have been tagged "Astro Boy" and "Bender". Eventually, this plan was discontinued, and version 1.0 did not have a codename, but version 1.1 got the internal codename "Petit Four", which launched the custom of naming Android releases after desserts. When codenames became public with version 1.5, they started to follow alphabetical order, beginning with "C" (apparently since the two previous public releases have been 'skipped' in this scheme). Since then, further releases of Android were named after desserts or sweet treats, with names being chosen in alphabetical order, although sometimes the same name was applied to multiple versions. Google stopped using dessert names as marketing names in 2019 with Android 10, however, they continued to be used internally and were even referenced on 11 and 12's statues ("Red Velvet Cake" for 11, and "Snow Cone" for 12). The statues were temporarily removed in early 2022 for relocation and repair.

A few days before each named operating system was unveiled, Google used to unveil a lawn statue representing that version's codename. The statues were on the lawn in front of Building 44, where the Android development team worked until August 2014.

Google stopped making physical statues after Android 10, which also was the first release that no longer used dessert theme names externally. Starting from Android 11, Google continued the tradition by releasing "statues" as 3D objects viewable online. The statue for Android 13, codenamed "Tiramisu" internally, was made in both physical and virtual formats.

== Statues ==
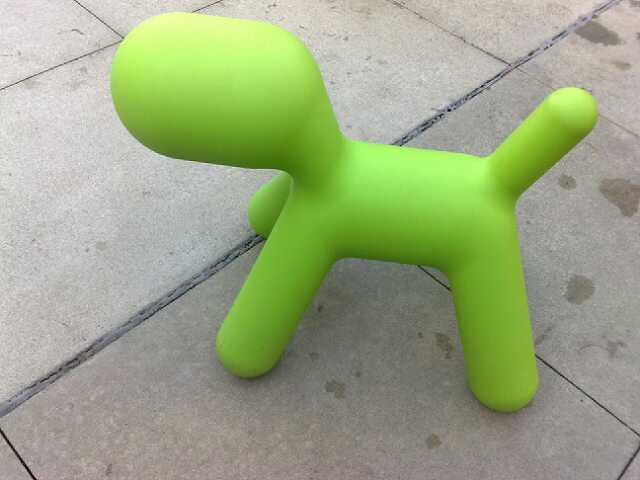
Android dog model, Puppy by Eero Aarnio, 2008

The green Android was joined early on by Alex, a dog of similar colour and design. It was actually a toy chair, Puppy by Eero Aarnio. This statue was stolen in 2009.

A similar incident happened in 2012. Due to the summer heat, the head of the Jelly Bean statue popped off, and one of the jelly beans inside was stolen. This prompted Android engineer Dan Morrill to post on Google+: "Jelly Bean is so ridiculously hot that the JB statue overheated, and his head partially melted and popped off. And then we think somebody stole one of the jelly beans. People: please don't steal our jelly beans." The statue has since been repaired.

In 2017, for the Android Oreo statue, Google ordered two different statues, with one of them featuring a single Oreo and a boxy design and the other (made by Themendous) with multiple Oreos and a more roundish shape.

The statues in the order of installation are:

Statue	Android version	Codename	Physical/Virtual
A green Android robot	Represents the operating system in general, and Android 1.0.		Physical
A cupcake	1.5	Cupcake	Physical
A donut	1.6	Donut	Physical
An éclair drizzled with chocolate syrup	2.0, 2.1	Eclair	Physical
A dish of frozen yogurt	2.2	Froyo	Physical
A Nexus One	First Google phone and 2.2 "Froyo" flagship device		Physical
An orange pair of headphones, representing the Google Play Music logo	Google Play Music		Physical
A gingerbread man	2.3	Gingerbread	Physical
A piece of honeycomb with a bee and the Android robot	3.0, 3.1, 3.2	Honeycomb	Physical
An ice cream sandwich in the shape of the Android robot	4.0	Ice Cream Sandwich	Physical
A jar in the shape of the Android robot filled with jelly beans	4.1, 4.2, 4.3	Jelly Bean	Physical
A KitKat bar in the shape of the Android robot	4.4	KitKat	Physical
An Android robot holding an oversized swirl lollipop	5.0, 5.1	Lollipop	Physical
An Android robot holding an oversized marshmallow	6.0	Marshmallow	Physical
An Android robot standing on nougat bars	7.0, 7.1	Nougat	Physical
An Android superhero robot with an Oreo cookie on it (two statues were made)	8.0, 8.1	Oreo	Physical
An Android robot with a cherry pie with a slice cut out of it	9.0	Pie	Physical
A giant signed "10" statue with the Android logo on the digit "0"	10.0	Quince Tart	Physical
A giant "11" statue with the Android logo between the numbers and a recipe for red velvet cake on the side	11.0	Red Velvet Cake	Virtual
A giant "12" statue with the Android logo on the digit "1", a cone on the digit "2", and snow pile on the bottom	12.0, 12.1	Snow Cone	Virtual
A giant sideways "13" statue with the digit "1" as the handle containing "thirteen" in 13 languages and the digit "3" as the seats.	13.0	Tiramisu	Both
A statue of Bugdroid’s full body in a jersey with the number "14", doing a handstand on an upside-down cake.	14.0	Upside Down Cake	Both

== See also ==
- Android version history
- Android (operating system)
