= Android IV =

Android IV may refer to:

- Android Ice Cream Sandwich, the fourth major version of the Android mobile operating system
- Android Jelly Bean, the codename given to the tenth version of the Android mobile operating system
- Android KitKat, the codename for the eleventh Android mobile operating system

== See also ==
- Android (operating system)
- Android version history
