= Master Quality Authenticated =

Audiophile audio processing technology

- Developed by: MQA Ltd.
- Type of format: Audio file format
- Website: https://mqalabs.com/

Master Quality Authenticated (MQA) is a proprietary system for delivering high-quality digital audio. The system includes audio signal processing, lossy audio compression and authentication. MQA requires licensing fees to use. The system was launched in 2014 by Meridian Audio, and is owned by Lenbrook since autumn 2023.

The MQA system is a three-part process applied to digital audio music recordings comprising:

1. modifying and controlling the end-to-end digital filter response;
2. preparing the audio for transfer to a smartphone or audio device using a lossy audio compression format with authentication; and
3. decompressing the recording for playback.

There has been controversy regarding several aspects of MQA. These aspects include but are not limited to whether the audio signal processing improves or degrades the sound quality, whether the lossy audio compression degrades the sound quality, the utility of the authentication function, and the effect of licensing fees on music recording and playback businesses.

== History ==
The press launch of MQA was held in December 2014 in London, followed by the company hosting a demonstration room at the Consumer Electronics Show in Las Vegas in January 2015. The initial hardware manufacturers which offered MQA decoding were Pioneer, Onkyo, and Mytek. In May 2016, Warner Music Group signed a long-term licensing deal with MQA.

The RIAA announced in May 2016 that MPEG-4 SLS and MQA were eligible to use the Hi-Res MUSIC logo on their products; the latter despite the logo being intended for lossless audio recordings. By 2017, music distribution companies Warner Music Group, Universal Music Group, Sony Music and Merlin Network had agreed to make some of their recordings in MQA format. Xiami Music began offering MQA streaming via its SVIP pricing tier in July 2019; however, the music service was discontinued in February 2021.

In March 2018, an MQA Live encoder box was released, which is intended for live music concerts to be streamed using the MQA compression algorithm.

In April 2021, internet radio station Radio Paradise began offering MQA on its channels.

In May 2021, the Apple Music streaming service announced a Lossless Audio pricing tier, which was described as a "death knell" for MQA.

In September 2022, online mastering service Masterchannel added MQA encoding to its suite of tools. The automated mastering is based on machine learning, and the MQA encoding process is applied after mastering. In the same month, Alpine Alps became the first aftermarket car audio company with full TIDAL integration. Head units are capable of MQA Core decoding when playing TIDAL Masters.

On November 9, 2022, MQA announced a new product called MQair, which is a hi-res wireless audio codec. Coinciding with the announcement, the Japan Audio Society (JAS) also released a statement certifying MQair with the "Hi-Res AUDIO WIRELESS" logo. MQair is the fourth codec to receive this, alongside LC3plus, LHDC and LDAC. MQAir is also known by the technical name SCL6 which stands for the sixth generation of scalable codec developed by MQA. MQair is agnostic and can handle files from almost any music streaming service. It can unfold regular MQA files and regular PCM music files. The technology supports both MQA and PCM audio up to stereo 384 kHz, with the encoded data rate able to be scaled seamlessly from 20 Mbit/s to below 200 kbit/s. This makes MQair suitable for use over Bluetooth, Ultra-Wideband (UWB) and Wi-Fi. MQair can be enabled via a firmware update on existing headphones, scales in realtime and works up to 10 meters. MQAir was subsequently renamed AIRIA.

On 3 April 2023, MQA Limited, the company behind MQA had gone into administration. The primary streaming service providing MQA format music, Tidal, subsequently began offering high-resolution PCM in addition to MQA in their HiFi Plus tier.

On 19 September 2023, Lenbrook acquired MQA Limited's assets.

As of 24 July 2024, Tidal streaming service dropped support of MQA in favor of FLAC, a lossless and open source format.

On 1 January 2025, it was reported that Lenbrook plans to create a new streaming service which will offer only MQA-encoded music, by then projected to be launched in May of 2025. By 2026, mqa.co.uk redirects to a new website promising a new audio codec in addition to MQA.

== Codec description ==
MQA encoding is lossy; it hierarchically compresses the relatively little energy in the higher frequency bands into data streams that are embedded in the lower frequency bands using proprietary dithering techniques, allowing for an apparent reduction in sample rate and hence file size.

After a series of such "origami" manipulations, a dithered and shaped version of the original audio, together with a touchup stream (the compressed difference between the original and modified streams), are distributed as a single 24-bit stream, with the most significant bits occupied by PCM audio compatible with non-MQA playback equipment. Depending on the implementation, as few as 13 bits may be reserved for PCM audio, with the lower-order bits rendered as noise by equipment without an MQA decoder.

MQA-encoded audio can be contained with file formats such as FLAC, ALAC or CD-DA; hence, it can be played back on systems either with or without an MQA decoder. In the latter case, the resulting audio contains high-frequency noise occupying the three least-significant bits, thus limiting playback on non-MQA devices effectively to 13 bits. Despite this, MQA claims that the quality is higher than a conventional 16-bit recording, because of the novel sampling and convolution processes. Other than the sampling and convolution methods, which were not explained by MQA in detail, the encoding process is similar to that used in XRCD and HDCD.

In addition to the compressed audio data, the codec also carries metadata for authentication and playback filter control. The authentication metadata instructs the decoder that the file contains MQA format and identifies basic or "Studio" certification, which may be indicated on the playback device. The playback filter control metadata instructs the playback device on which filter to use for reconstruction of the analogue waveform.

Unlike popular lossy compression formats like MP3, AAC and WMA that use perceptual encoding based on psychoacoustic models, the lossy encoding method of MQA is similar to aptX and WavPack Hybrid Lossy, which uses time-domain ADPCM and bitrate reduction. Although MQA compression is lossy, it is claimed to be audibly transparent.

== Audio signal processing description ==
MQA processes the digital audio recording to alter the impulse response of the end-to-end filter chain from recording and production to playback. This is described as changing the time domain response similar to that of sound passing through less than 20 meters of air. The MQA filter response process starts with the ADC, either by a known make and model or by analyzing artifacts in the recording, and ends with control of the filter in the playback DAC. It is common for consumer DACs to include user selectable filters, including apodization filters intended to improve time domain transient response without knowledge of the production filters, whereas MQA controls the DAC filter to complete the MQA designed end-to-end time domain filter response.

== Authentication description ==
The MQA processed file contains an authentication function that indicates if the file is in the MQA format or not. There are two defined categories of MQA authentication: "MQA" (which may be indicated with a green light), meaning that the file has not been altered since creation, and "MQA Studio" (which may be indicated with a blue light), which additionally means that someone representing the studio or artist validated that the file is an approved version. One claimed intent of the MQA authentication feature is to assure that the recording is genuine and unadulterated from the MQA processed studio master recording, though the veracity of this authentication has been called into question.

== Reception ==
=== Positive ===
Robert Harley, editor of The Absolute Sound stated in March 2016 that MQA "will forever change the way we and future generations consider digital audio".

John Atkinson, editor of Stereophile stated the following about the launch of MQA in December 2014 "In almost 40 years of attending audio press events, only rarely have I come away feeling that I was present at the birth of a new world."

In the 2L Records 2015 announcement of an MQA remastered release of piano recordings, company owner Morten Lindberg stated "I have spent many hours with Bob listening to original recordings and being constantly amazed by the incredible sense of space and clarity brought by MQA", in comparison to the drawbacks and weaknesses of the early digital technology originally used for the recordings.

In the Atlantic Records announcement that it would sell records using the MQA format, CEO Craig Kallman stated in May 2016 that "MQA makes high-resolution music easy to stream or download to any device. Music fans will love it when they hear it, and WMG is thrilled to be partnering with MQA to take the next step in bringing hi-res music to consumers around the globe". Similarly, when Universal Music Group announced in February 2017 that they would be selling songs in MQA format, company executive Michael Nash stated "with MQA, we are working with a partner whose technology is among the best solutions for streaming high-res audio, and one that doesn't ask music fans to compromise on sound quality for convenience".

=== Negative ===
An article titled "Digital Done Wrong" on the International Audio/Video Review website concluded that MQA is founded on a fundamentally unsound understanding of correct digital audio processing and found that playback of a sample MQA encoding demonstrated gross distortion and reconstruction failure. It did, however, comment that some listeners may find the technical defects of MQA encoding subjectively pleasing.

Singer and musician Neil Young has expressed dislike for the MQA format, saying the masters are "degraded and manipulated" when encoded to MQA and has consequently removed his music from Tidal, after finding out that his catalogue on the service was encoded in MQA without his permission, criticizing Warner Music Group (which owns Reprise Records that Young has released most of his catalogue through) for encoding music whose masters are no better than CD-quality in MQA. He also characterizes the format as a way to collect royalties.

Some critical comments have been made in online forums such as the Audiophile Style forum and in audio magazine website comments, and a few writers have expressed concern in some areas. Over 80 detailed questions, some of which voiced these concerns, were submitted to the editors of the Audiophile Style forum and subsequently addressed in detail by the creator of MQA, Bob Stuart, in an extended question-and-answer article. The editors of Audiophile Style forum subsequently updated the article with a disclaimer that "Most of Bob Stuart's answers have been debunked and the MQA technology is now seen as lacking any benefit for anyone other than record labels and MQA Ltd."

Audio product manufacturer Schiit Audio announced that it will not be supporting MQA due, amongst other reasons, to the understanding that "…supporting MQA means handing over the entire recording industry to an external standards organization."

In a blog post titled "MQA is Bad for Music. Here's Why", hi-fi manufacturer Linn Products criticises MQA's licensing requirements, asserting that MQA is "...an attempt to control and extract revenue from every part of the supply chain, and not just over content that they hold the rights for." After having discussed several disadvantages for both the artist and the consumer, Linn concludes that a consumer will "…pay a higher price for the same music, and you'll pay more for your hi-fi system too. And even if you don't buy into MQA, everyone will get less innovation, creativity and poorer music as a result."

In an interview for online publication Positive Feedback, engineer Andreas Koch is critical of MQA due to its lossy algorithms and compression, along with its licensing requirements; also saying that a format such as this "does not solve any problem that the world currently has." Koch was involved in the creation of the Super Audio CD, the development of the Direct Stream Digital codec, and is co-founder of audio product manufacturer Playback Designs.

While the encoding system remains proprietary, work by Måns Rullgård was able to examine the control stream after the first decoding step through analysis of the Bluesound "rendering" firmware in early 2017 with published code. Using the reverse-engineered code, audio blogger Archimago published results of the MQA dithering, noise shaping, and resampling options in the MQA "rendering" step. MQA's upsampling filter impulse responses were published by July 2017. A critical review of MQA titled "MQA: A Review of Controversies, Concerns, and Cautions" was published in Audiophile Style in early 2018. MQA declined a request for formal response to the contents of the article.

The GoldenSound audio equipment review website examined MQA through the use of author-created audio tracks released on Tidal. Through analysis of tracks before and after MQA conversion, it was found that encoding a file in MQA alters the sound encapsulated in the file to its detriment. GoldenSound deduced that this method of encoding shows MQA has been providing unfounded information on how their encoding and format work. Shortly after contacting MQA for clarification about the issues, the files in question were deleted from Tidal. (Bob Stuart wrote on his blog that "MQA did not delete his files; that accusation is false") MQA stated that the files supplied were not dithered but truncated 16-bit files (meaning they were of higher bit rate originally) leading to the issues in encoding. GoldenSound disputes this, saying they have tested the track both dithered and undithered. GoldenSound also reports ineffectiveness of the fingerprinting technique, which was also experienced by Neil Young and FredericV. The findings prompted AIX Records through its founder Mark Waldrep (himself a mastering engineer) to demand the label's catalogue removed from Tidal as long as they would MQA-process AIX' masters. To counter the points made by GoldenSound, Jim Austin of Stereophile published an article which included criticism of the use of test signals which violated the MQA encoder parameters that are designed for music, and stating that the "GoldenSound's tests are a missed opportunity" and that the "critique is unfair". Following Lenbrook's acquisition in 2023, Soundstage Solo editor Geoffrey Morrison would link MQA's decline and distressed restructuring to the lossiness issues uncovered by GoldenSound.

== Playback devices ==
Hardware decoders are sold by Pioneer, Onkyo, Astell & Kern, Sony and others. Software decoders are sold by Tidal, and Roon.

Compact discs encoded with MQA (MQA-CD) were first released in 2017, beginning with the publisher Ottava. The MQA decoding will occur if an MQA decoder is connected.

MQA Ltd collects a royalty for every commercial MQA-capable playback unit sold. MQA Ltd prohibits digital output of unpacked MQA in any digital format, only allowing the unpacked data to be fed to an on-board MQA-compatible DAC and output in analogue form.
