= Meizu M1 Note =

Smartphone by Meizu

- Manufacturer: Meizu
- Type: Smartphone
- Series: Meizu m note
- First released: China; December 23, 2014; 11 years ago
- Successor: Meizu M2 Note
- Compatible networks: 2G; 3G; 4G
- Weight: 145 g (5.1 oz)
- Operating system: Android 4.4 or up gradable to 5.0 Lollipop
- System-on-chip: MediaTek MT6752
- CPU: Octa-core 1.7 GHz Cortex-A53
- GPU: Mali (GPU) T760
- Memory: 2 GB
- Storage: 16 GB; 32 GB
- Removable storage: No
- Battery: Non-removable 3140 mAh
- Rear camera: 13 MP, 4208 x 3120 pixels, autofocus, dual-LED (dual tone) flash
- Front camera: 5 MP
- Display: 1920x1080px IPS Screen FullHD 418dpi
- Connectivity: Bluetooth WiFi
- Other: Wireless Charger, Flyme account, Flyme cloud

The Meizu M1 Note is a smartphone by Chinese manufacturer Meizu. It was announced in China on December 23, 2014, and released in early January 2015. The Meizu M1 Note is positioned as a "quality for young" device.

== Specifications ==
=== Hardware ===
The Meizu m1 note features a 5.5-inch 1080p IGZO IPS LCD protected by Corning Gorilla Glass 3. It was powered by a Mediatek MT6752 octa-core processor and ran Android 4.4.4 KitKat with Flyme 4. The phone had a 13 MP main camera, a 5 MP selfie camera, and a 3140 mAh non-removable battery.

== Features ==
- 5.5-inch 1080 x 1920 px full-HD display of 403 ppi
- Dual SIM (Micro-SIM, dual stand-by)
- Heavily customized Flyme OS 4 on top of Android 4.4.4 (KitKat)
- Octa-core 1.7 GHz Cortex-A53 chipset, 2 GB of RAM
- 13 MP rear camera, 4208 × 3120 pixels, autofocus, dual-LED (dual tone) flash
- 5 MP front-facing camera
- 16 GB or 32 GB built-in storage
- Wi-Fi 802.11 a/b/g/n, dual-band, Wi-Fi Direct, hotspot
- Bluetooth v4.0, A2DP, LE
- A-GPS, GLONASS
- 3,140 mAh battery
- OTG supported
