= ChoreMonster =

Web and mobile application suite

- ChoreMonster app screenshots
- Original authors: Chris Bergman and Paul Armstrong
- Release: 2011; 15 years ago
- Platform: Android, Google, Nintendo 3DS
- Available in: English
- Website: www.choremonster.com

ChoreMonster was a suite of web and mobile applications. Its premise was to make chores fun for kids and parents. As of 2018, ChoreMonster is defunct.

== Features ==
ChoreMonster utilized two different apps, one for children and one for parents. The adult version allowed parents to set up task lists, deadlines, rewards, and points for completing jobs. In the children's version, kids could view what tasks they have been assigned and what rewards and points are awarded for getting those items done. Parents must approve their child's completion of a chore before the points can be redeemed. In addition to winning rewards from their parents, children could collect animated monsters through reaching various milestones. The app's reward system was based on the idea of positive reinforcement, encouraging kids to complete responsibilities that they are not normally inclined to do. The Monster Carnival provided children the possibility of earning additional interactive monsters as well as consolation prizes through spinning a wheel. Children were given one spin per chore completed.

== Business ==
Chris Bergman and Paul Armstrong founded ChoreMonster in 2011. The Cincinnati-based startup won the top prize in the Cincinnati Innovates competition, went through accelerator The Brandery, and has received funding from CincyTech, Vine Street Ventures, and Detroit Venture Partners. ChoreMonster publicly launched in December 2012. In 2014, ChoreMonster graduated from the Disney/Techstars Accelerator, announcing new partnerships with both companies.

== Platforms ==
ChoreMonster was available for free download in the iTunes App Store and Windows Store. Parents and children could also sign up online through the company's website. ChoreMonster launched for Android in 2014 and was available in the Google Play Store. There were plans to release on Nintendo 3DS in 2015. No updated releases since 2018.
