= High Fidelity Pure Audio =

Digital audio medium

HFPA Blu-ray
- HFPA Blu-ray logo
- Media type: Blu-ray
- Encoding: Menu screen H.264/MPEG-4 AVC; Audio 2.0 or 5.1 Surround; Dolby TrueHD; DTS-HD Master Audio; LPCM
- Capacity: 25 GB (single-layer); 50 GB (dual-layer)
- Read mechanism: 405 nm diode laser
- Developed by: Sony Pictures Entertainment, Sony Music Entertainment, Universal Pictures, Universal Music

High Fidelity Pure Audio, occasionally abbreviated as HFPA or BD-A, is a marketing initiative, spearheaded by Sony Music and Universal Music Group, for audio-only Blu-ray optical discs. Launched in 2013 as a potential successor to the compact disc (CD), it has been compared with DVD-Audio and SACD, which had similar aims.

HFPA is encoded as 24-bit/96 kHz or 24-bit/192 kHz linear PCM ("high-resolution audio"), optionally losslessly compressed with Dolby TrueHD or DTS-HD Master Audio.

HFPA discs are compatible with existing Blu-ray players.

Pure Audio Blu-ray refers to a different initiative (but with some goals in common) launched by msm-studios in Germany in 2009.

As of November 2019, Deutsche Grammophon is the most prolific publisher on the format, with Beethoven 250 having three Blu-ray audio discs.
