= Android version history =

List of Android operating system versions

Android 17 is the current version of Android, released on June 16, 2026.

The version history of the Android mobile operating system began with the public release of its first beta on November 5, 2007. The first commercial version, Android 1.0, was released on September 23, 2008. The operating system has been developed by Google on a yearly schedule since at least 2011. New major releases are usually announced at Google I/O in May, along with beta testing, with the stable version released to the public between August and October. From 2025, new versions were announced in the first quarter and shipped in the second quarter.

== Overview ==
The development of Android started in 2003 by Android, Inc., which was purchased by Google in 2005. There were at least two internal releases of the software inside Google and the Open Handset Alliance (OHA) before the beta version was released. The beta was released on November 5, 2007, while the software development kit (SDK) was released on November 12, 2007. Several public beta versions of the SDK were released. These releases were done through software emulation as physical devices did not exist to test the operating system. Both the operating system itself and the SDK were released along with their source code, as free software under the Apache License.

The first public release of Android 1.0 was in October 2008 with the launch of the T-Mobile G1 (HTC Dream). Android 1.0 and 1.1 were not released under specific code names. The code names "Astro Boy" and "Bender" were tagged internally on some of the early pre-1.0 milestone builds and were never used as the actual code names of the 1.0 and 1.1 releases of the OS.

The project manager, Ryan Gibson, came up with a confectionery-themed naming scheme for public releases, starting with Android 1.5 Cupcake in 2009. Google announced in August 2019 that they were ending the confectionery theming scheme and would use numerical ordering for future versions. The first release under the numerical order format was Android 10, which was released in September 2019.

In 2017, Google announced Google Play would begin to require apps to target the newest Android version (or API level). Since then, apps must target it by August 31 of the following year for new apps, or November 1 for app updates. These requirements have expanded to Wear OS, Android TV, and Android Automotive OS with a 12-month grace period to target the latest version of Android.

Name	Internal codename	Version number(s)	API level	Release date	Latest security patch date	Latest Google Play Services version (release date)
Android 1.0	—N/a	1.0	1	September 23, 2008	—N/a	—N/a
Android 1.1	Petit Four	1.1	2	February 9, 2009	—N/a	—N/a
Android Cupcake	Cupcake	1.5	3	April 27, 2009	—N/a	—N/a
Android Donut	Donut	1.6	4	September 15, 2009	—N/a	—N/a
Android Eclair	Eclair	2.0	5	October 27, 2009	—N/a	—N/a
Android Eclair	Eclair	2.0.1	6	December 3, 2009	—N/a	—N/a
Android Eclair	Eclair	2.1	7	January 11, 2010	—N/a	—N/a
Android Froyo	Froyo	2.2 – 2.2.3	8	May 20, 2010	—N/a	3.2.67 (January 2014)
Android Gingerbread	Gingerbread	2.3 – 2.3.2	9	December 6, 2010	—N/a	10.0.84 (November 2016)
Android Gingerbread	Gingerbread	2.3.3 – 2.3.7	10	February 9, 2011	—N/a	10.0.84 (November 2016)
Android Honeycomb	Honeycomb	3.0	11	February 22, 2011	—N/a	10.0.84 (November 2016)
Android Honeycomb	Honeycomb	3.1	12	May 10, 2011	—N/a	10.0.84 (November 2016)
Android Honeycomb	Honeycomb	3.2 – 3.2.6	13	July 15, 2011	—N/a	10.0.84 (November 2016)
Android Ice Cream Sandwich	Ice Cream Sandwich	4.0 – 4.0.2	14	October 18, 2011	—N/a	14.8.49 (February 2019)
Android Ice Cream Sandwich	Ice Cream Sandwich	4.0.3 – 4.0.4	15	December 16, 2011	—N/a	14.8.49 (February 2019)
Android Jelly Bean	Jelly Bean	4.1 – 4.1.2	16	July 9, 2012	—N/a	21.33.56 (September 2021)
Android Jelly Bean	Jelly Bean	4.2 – 4.2.2	17	November 13, 2012	—N/a	21.33.56 (September 2021)
Android Jelly Bean	Jelly Bean	4.3 – 4.3.1	18	July 24, 2013	—N/a	21.33.56 (September 2021)
Android KitKat	Key Lime Pie	4.4 – 4.4.4	19	October 31, 2013	October 2017	23.30.13 (August 2023)
Android KitKat	Key Lime Pie	4.4W – 4.4W.2	20	June 25, 2014	N/A	23.30.13 (August 2023)
Android Lollipop	Lemon Meringue Pie	5.0 – 5.0.2	21	November 4, 2014	November 2017	24.28.35 (August 2024)
Android Lollipop	Lemon Meringue Pie	5.1 – 5.1.1	22	March 2, 2015	March 2018	24.28.35 (August 2024)
Android Marshmallow	Macadamia Nut Cookie	6.0 – 6.0.1	23	September 29, 2015	August 2018	26.26.65 (July 2026)
Android Nougat	New York Cheesecake	7.0	24	August 22, 2016	August 2019	26.46.32 (November 2026)
Android Nougat	New York Cheesecake	7.1 – 7.1.2	25	October 4, 2016	October 2019	26.46.32 (November 2026)
Android Oreo	Oatmeal Cookie	8.0	26	August 21, 2017	January 2021	26.46.32 (November 2026)
Android Oreo	Oatmeal Cookie	8.1	27	December 5, 2017	October 2021	26.46.32 (November 2026)
Android Pie	Pistachio Ice Cream	9	28	August 6, 2018	January 2022	26.46.32 (November 2026)
Android 10	Quince Tart	10	29	September 3, 2019	February 2023	26.46.32 (November 2026)
Android 11	Red Velvet Cake	11	30	September 8, 2020	February 2024	26.46.32 (November 2026)
Android 12	Snow Cone	12	31	October 4, 2021	March 2025	26.46.32 (November 2026)
Android 12L	Snow Cone v2	12.1 (Note: 12L launched as part of the March 2022 security update to supported Pixel devices. The factory images for March 2022 and subsequent updates display the version as 12.1. The device's about page will still show the Android version as 12.)	32	March 7, 2022	March 2025	26.46.32 (November 2026)
Android 13	Tiramisu	13	33	August 15, 2022	February 2026	26.46.32 (November 2026)
Android 14	Upside Down Cake	14	34	October 4, 2023	November 2026	26.46.32 (November 2026)
Android 15	Vanilla Ice Cream	15	35	September 3, 2024	November 2026	26.46.32 (November 2026)
Android 16	Baklava	16	36	June 10, 2025	November 2026	26.46.32 (November 2026)
Android 17	Cinnamon Bun	17	37	June 16, 2026	November 2026	26.46.32 (November 2026)
Legend: Unsupported Supported Latest version Preview version

== Version history ==
The following tables show the release dates and key features of all Android operating system updates to date, listed chronologically by their official application programming interface (API) levels.

=== Android 1.0 ===
Android 1.0, the first commercial version of the software, was released on September 23, 2008. The first commercially available Android device was the HTC Dream.

Android 1.0 (API 1)
Version	Release date	Features
1.0	September 23, 2008	Android Market, allowing application downloads and updates through the Market application.; Web browser to show, zoom and pan full HTML and XHTML web pages – multiple pages show as windows ("cards").; Camera support – however, this version lacked the option to change the camera's resolution, white balance, quality, etc.; Folders allowing the grouping of a number of application icons into a single folder icon on the Home screen.; Access to web email servers, supporting POP3, IMAP4, and SMTP.; Gmail synchronization with the Gmail application.; Google Contacts synchronization with the People application.; Google Calendar synchronization with the Calendar application.; Google Maps with Street View to view maps and satellite imagery, as well as find local businesses and obtain driving directions using GPS.; Google Sync, allowing management of over-the-air synchronization of Gmail, People, and Calendar.; Google Search, allowing users to search the Internet and phone applications, contacts, calendar, etc.; Google Talk instant messaging.; Instant messaging, text messaging, and MMS.; Media Player, enabling management, importing, and playback of media files – however, this version lacked video and stereo Bluetooth support.; Notifications appear in the Status bar, with options to set ringtone, LED or vibration alerts.; Voice Dialer allows dialing and placing of phone calls without typing a name or number.; Wallpaper allows the user to set the background image or photo behind the Home screen icons and widgets.; YouTube video player.; Other applications include: Alarm Clock, Calculator, Dialer (Phone), Home screen (Launcher), Pictures (Gallery), and Settings.; Wi-Fi and Bluetooth support.

=== Android 1.1 ===
On February 9, 2009, the Android 1.1 update was released, initially for the HTC Dream only. Android 1.1 was known as "Petit Four" internally, though this name was not used officially. The update resolved bugs, changed the Android API and added a number of features:

Android 1.1 (API 2)
Version	Release date	Features
1.1	February 9, 2009	Details and reviews available when a user searches for businesses on Maps.; Longer in-call screen timeout by default when using the speakerphone, plus the ability to show/hide the dialpad.; Ability to save attachments in messages.; Support added for marquee in system layouts.

=== Android 1.5 Cupcake ===
On April 27, 2009, the Android 1.5 update was released, based on Linux kernel 2.6.27. This was the first release to officially use a codename based on a dessert item ("Cupcake"), a theme used for all releases until Android Pie, with Android 10 and later using a number-only system. The update included several new features and UI amendments:

Android 1.5 Cupcake (API 3)
Version	Release date	Features
1.5	April 27, 2009	Support for third-party virtual keyboards with text prediction and a user dictionary for custom words.; Support for Widgets – miniature application views that can be embedded in other applications (such as the Home screen) and receive periodic updates.; Video recording and playback in MPEG-4 and 3GP formats.; Auto-pairing and stereo support for Bluetooth (A2DP and AVRCP profiles).; Copy and paste features in web browser.; User pictures shown for Favorites in Contacts.; Specific date/time stamp shown for events in call log, and one-touch access to a contact card from a call log event.; Animated screen transitions.; Auto-rotation option.; New stock boot animation.; Ability to upload videos to YouTube.; Ability to upload photos to Picasa.; Ability to check phone usage history.

=== Android 1.6 Donut ===
On September 15, 2009, Android 1.6 – dubbed Donut – was released, based on Linux kernel 2.6.29. Included in the update were numerous new features:

Android 1.6 Donut (API 4)
Version	Release date	Features
1.6	September 15, 2009	Voice and text entry search enhanced to include bookmark history, contacts, and the web.; Ability for developers to include their content in search results.; Multi-lingual speech synthesis engine to allow any Android application to "speak" a string of text.; Easier searching and the ability to view app screenshots in Android Market.; Gallery, Camera and camcorder more fully integrated, with faster camera access.; Ability for users to select multiple photos for deletion.; Updated technology support for CDMA/EVDO, 802.1x, VPNs, and a text-to-speech engine.; Support for WVGA screen resolutions.; Speed improvements in searching and camera applications.; Expanded Gesture framework and a new GestureBuilder development tool.

=== Android 2.0 Eclair ===
On October 27, 2009, the Android 2.0 SDK was released, based on Linux kernel 2.6.29 and codenamed Eclair. Changes include the ones listed below.

Android 2.0 Eclair (API 5)
Version	Release date	Features
2.0	October 27, 2009	Expanded Account sync, allowing users to add multiple accounts to a device for synchronization of an email and contacts.; Microsoft Exchange email support, with a combined inbox to browse an email from multiple accounts in one page.; Bluetooth 2.1 support.; Ability to tap a Contacts photo and select to call, SMS, or email the person.; Ability to search all saved SMS and MMS messages, with the added ability to delete the oldest messages in a conversation automatically deleted when a defined limit is reached.; Numerous new camera features, including flash support, digital zoom, scene mode, white balance, color effect and macro focus.; Improved typing speed on a virtual keyboard, with a smarter dictionary that learns from word usage and includes contact names as suggestions.; Refreshed browser UI with bookmark thumbnails, double-tap zoom and support for HTML5.; Calendar agenda view enhanced, showing attending status for each invitee, and the ability to invite new guests to events.; Optimized hardware speed and revamped UI.; Support for more screen sizes and resolutions, with better contrast ratio.; Improved Google Maps 3.1.2.; MotionEvent class enhanced to track multi-touch events.; Pressure-sensitive touch support in API, even though no according hardware existed at that time.

==== Android 2.0.1 Eclair ====
Android 2.0.1 Eclair (API 6)
Version	Release date	Features
2.0.1	December 3, 2009	Minor API changes, bug fixes and framework behavioral changes.

==== Android 2.1 Eclair ====
Android 2.1 Eclair (API 7)
Version	Release date	Features
2.1	January 11, 2010	Addition of live wallpapers, allowing the animation of home-screen background images to show movement.; Minor amendments to the API and bug fixes.

=== Android 2.2 Froyo ===
On May 20, 2010, the SDK for Android 2.2 (Froyo, short for frozen yogurt) was released, based on Linux kernel 2.6.32.

Android 2.2 Froyo (API 8)
Version	Release date	Features
2.2	May 20, 2010	Speed, memory, and performance optimizations.; Additional application speed improvements, implemented through JIT compilation.; Integration of Chrome's V8 JavaScript engine into the Browser application.; Support for the Android Cloud to Device Messaging (C2DM) service, enabling push notifications.; Improved Microsoft Exchange support, including security policies, auto-discovery, GAL look-up, calendar synchronization and remote wipe.; Improved application launcher with shortcuts to Phone and Browser applications.; USB tethering and Wi-Fi hotspot functionality; Option to disable data access over a mobile network.; Updated Market application with batch and automatic update features.; Quick switching between multiple keyboard languages and their dictionaries.; Support for Bluetooth-enabled car and desk docks.; Support for numeric and alphanumeric passwords.; Support for file upload fields in the Browser application.; The browser now shows all frames of animated GIFs instead of just the first frame only.; Support for installing applications to expandable memory.; Adobe Flash support.; Support for high-PPI displays (up to 320 ppi), such as four-inch 720p screens.; Gallery allows users to view picture stacks using a zoom gesture.
2.2.1	September 27, 2010	Bug fixes, security updates and performance improvements.
2.2.2	January 21, 2011	Minor bug fixes, including SMS routing issues that affected the Nexus One.
2.2.3	November 21, 2011	Two security updates.

=== Android 2.3 Gingerbread ===
On December 6, 2010, the Android 2.3 (Gingerbread) SDK was released, based on Linux kernel 2.6.35. Changes included:

Android 2.3 Gingerbread (API 9)
Version	Release date	Features
2.3	December 6, 2010	Updated user interface design with increased simplicity and speed.; Support for extra-large screen sizes and resolutions (WXGA and higher).; Native support for SIP VoIP internet telephones.; Faster, more intuitive text input on a virtual keyboard, with improved accuracy, better suggested text and voice input mode.; Enhanced copy/paste functionality, allowing users to select a word by press-holding, copying, and pasting.; Support for Near Field Communication (NFC), allowing the user to read an NFC tag embedded in a poster, sticker, or advertisement.; New audio effects such as reverb, equalization, headphone virtualization, and bass boost.; New Download Manager, giving users easy access to any file downloaded from the browser, email, or another application.; Support for multiple cameras on the device, including a front-facing camera, if available.; Support for WebM/VP8 video playback, and AAC audio encoding.; Improved power management with a more active role in managing applications that are keeping the device awake for too long.; Enhanced support for native code development.; Switched from YAFFS to ext4 on newer devices.; Audio, graphical, and input enhancements for game developers.; Concurrent garbage collection for increased performance.; Native support for more sensors (such as gyroscopes and barometers).; First Android version to feature an Easter egg. It was an image of the Bugdroid standing next to a zombie gingerbread man, with many more zombies in the background.
2.3.1	December 22, 2010	Improvements and bug fixes for the Nexus S.
2.3.2	January 21, 2011	Improvements and bug fixes for the Nexus S.

==== Android 2.3.3 Gingerbread ====
Android 2.3.3 Gingerbread (API 10)
Version	Release date	Features
2.3.3	February 9, 2011	Several improvements and API fixes.
2.3.4	April 28, 2011	Support for voice or video chat using Google Talk.; Open Accessory Library support. Open Accessory was introduced in 3.1 (Honeycomb) but the Open Accessory Library grants 2.3.4 added support when connecting to a USB peripheral with compatible software and a compatible application on the device.; Switched the default encryption for SSL from AES256-SHA to RC4-MD5.; Fixed a spontaneous reboot on Samsung Galaxy S Plus.
2.3.5	July 25, 2011	Improved network performance for the Nexus S 4G, among other fixes and improvements.; Fixed a Bluetooth bug on Samsung Galaxy S.; Fixed a Wi-Fi crash on Samsung Galaxy S Plus.; Improved the Gmail application.; Shadow animations for list scrolling.; Camera software enhancements.; Improved battery efficiency.
2.3.6	September 2, 2011	Fixed a voice search bug. (Note: The 2.3.6 update had the side-effect of impairing the Wi-Fi hotspot functionality of many Canadian Nexus S phones. Google acknowledged this problem and fixed it in late September.)
2.3.7	September 21, 2011	Google Wallet support for the Nexus S 4G.

=== Android 3.0 Honeycomb ===
On February 22, 2011, the Android 3.0 (Honeycomb) SDK – the first tablet-only Android update – was released, based on Linux kernel 2.6.36. The first device featuring this version, the Motorola Xoom tablet, was released on February 24, 2011. The update's features included:

Android 3.0 Honeycomb (API 11)
Version	Release date	Features
3.0	February 22, 2011	Optimized tablet support with a new "holographic" user interface (removed again the following year with version 4.2).; New Easter egg, an image of a Tron-themed bumblebee.; Added System Bar, featuring quick access to notifications, status, and soft navigation buttons, available at the bottom of the screen.; Added the Action Bar, giving access to contextual options, navigation, widgets, or other types of content at the top of the screen.; Simplified multitasking – tapping Recent Applications in the System Bar allows users to see snapshots of the tasks underway and quickly jump from one application to another.; Redesigned the keyboard, making typing fast, efficient and accurate on larger screen sizes; Simplified, more intuitive copy/paste interface.; Multiple browser tabs replacing browser windows, plus form auto-fill and a new "incognito" mode allowing somewhat anonymous browsing.; Quick access to camera exposure, focus, flash, zoom, front-facing camera, time-lapse, and other camera features.; Ability to view albums and other collections in full-screen mode in Gallery, with easy access to thumbnails for other photos.; New two-pane Contacts UI and Fast Scroll to let users easily organize and locate contacts.; New two-pane Email UI to make viewing and organizing messages more efficient, allowing users to select one or more messages.; Hardware acceleration.; Support for multi-core processors.; Ability to encrypt all user data.; HTTPS stack improved with Server Name Indication (SNI).; Filesystem in Userspace (FUSE; kernel module).; Disallows applications from having to write access to secondary storage (memory cards on devices with internal primary storage) outside of designated, application-specific directories. Full access to primary internal storage is still allowed through a separate application-level permission.

==== Android 3.1 Honeycomb ====
Android 3.1 Honeycomb (API 12)
Version	Release date	Features
3.1	May 10, 2011	UI refinements.; Connectivity for USB accessories (USB On-The-Go).; Expanded Recent Applications list.; Resizable Home screen widgets.; Support for external keyboards and pointing devices.; Support for joysticks and gamepads.; Support for FLAC audio playback.; High-performance Wi-Fi lock, maintaining high-performance Wi-Fi connections when the device screen is off.; Support for HTTP proxy for each connected Wi-Fi access point.

==== Android 3.2 Honeycomb ====
Android 3.2 Honeycomb (API 13)
Version	Release date	Features
3.2	July 15, 2011	Improved hardware support, including optimizations for a wider range of tablets.; Increased ability of applications to access files on the SD card, e.g. for synchronization.; Compatibility display mode for applications that have not been optimized for tablet screen resolutions.; New display support functions, giving developers more control over display appearance on different Android devices.
3.2.1	September 20, 2011	Bug fixes and minor security, stability and Wi-Fi improvements.; Update to Android Market with automatic updates and easier-to-read Terms and Conditions text.; Update to Google Books.; Improved Adobe Flash support in browser.; Improved Chinese handwriting prediction.
3.2.2	September 30, 2011	Bug fixes and other minor improvements for the Motorola Xoom 4G.
3.2.4	December 15, 2011	Pay As You Go for 3G and 4G tablets.
3.2.6	February 15, 2012	Fixed data connectivity issues when coming out of Airplane mode on the US 4G Motorola Xoom.

=== Android 4.0 Ice Cream Sandwich ===
The SDK for Android 4.0.1 (Ice Cream Sandwich), based on Linux kernel 3.0.1, was publicly released on October 19, 2011. Google's Gabe Cohen stated that Android 4.0 was "theoretically compatible" with any Android 2.3.x device in production at that time. The source code for Android 4.0 became available on November 14, 2011. Ice Cream Sandwich was the last version to officially support Adobe Systems' Flash player. The update introduced numerous new features:

Android 4.0 Ice Cream Sandwich (API 14)
Version	Release date	Features
4.0	October 18, 2011	Major refinements to the "Holo" interface with the new Roboto font family.; Soft buttons from Android 3.x are now available for use on phones.; Separation of widgets in a new tab, listed in a similar manner to applications.; Easier-to-create folders, with a drag-and-drop style.; Improved visual voicemail with the ability to speed up or slow down voicemail messages.; Pinch-to-zoom functionality in the Calendar.; Integrated screenshot capture (accomplished by holding down the Power and Volume-Down buttons).; Improved error correction on the keyboard.; Ability to access applications directly from the lock screen.; Improved copy-and-paste functionality.; Better voice integration and continuous, real-time speech-to-text dictation.; Face Unlock, a feature that allows users to unlock handsets using facial recognition software.; Automatic syncing of browser with users' Chrome bookmarks.; Data Usage section in settings that lets users set warnings when they approach a certain usage limit, and disable data use when the limit is exceeded.; Ability to shut down applications from the recent apps list with a swipe.; Improved camera application with zero shutter lag, time lapse settings, panorama mode, and the ability to zoom while recording.; Built-in photo editor.; New gallery layout, organized by location and person.; Refreshed the "People" application with social network integration, status updates and hi-res images.; Android Beam, a near-field communication feature allowing the rapid short-range exchange of web bookmarks, contact info, directions, YouTube videos and other data.; Support for the WebP image format.; Hardware acceleration of the UI.; Wi-Fi Direct.; 1080p video recording for stock Android devices.; Android VPN Framework (AVF), and TUN (but not TAP) kernel module. Prior to 4.0, VPN software required a rooted Android device.
4.0.1	October 19, 2011	Fixed minor bugs for the Samsung Galaxy Nexus.
4.0.2	November 28, 2011	Fixed minor bugs on the Verizon Galaxy Nexus, the US launch of which was later delayed until December 2011. (Note: For Canadian consumers, 4.0.2 reportedly created a bug on the Galaxy Nexus that crashed the application market when users attempted to view details of any Android application. It also inadvertently reduced the NFC capabilities of the Nexus phone.)

==== Android 4.0.3 Ice Cream Sandwich ====
Android 4.0.3 Ice Cream Sandwich (API 15)
Version	Release date	Features
4.0.3	December 16, 2011	Numerous bug fixes and optimizations.; Improvements to graphics, databases, spell-checking and Bluetooth functionality.; New APIs for developers, including a social stream API in the Contacts provider.; Calendar provider enhancements.; New camera applications enhancing video stabilization and QVGA resolution.; Accessibility refinements such as improved content access for screen readers.
4.0.4	March 28, 2012	Stability improvements.; Better camera performance.; Smoother screen rotation.; Improved phone number recognition.

=== Android 4.1 Jelly Bean ===
Google announced Android 4.1 (Jelly Bean) at the Google I/O conference on June 27, 2012. Based on Linux kernel 3.0.31, Jelly Bean was an incremental update with the primary aim of improving the functionality and performance of the user interface. The performance improvement involved "Project Butter", which uses touch anticipation, triple buffering, extended vsync timing and a fixed frame rate of 60 fps to create a fluid and "buttery-smooth" UI. Android 4.1 Jelly Bean was released to the Android Open Source Project on July 9, 2012, and the Nexus 7 tablet, the first device to run Jelly Bean, was released on July 13, 2012.

Android 4.1 Jelly Bean (API 16)
Version	Release date	Features
4.1	July 9, 2012	Smoother user interface: Vsync timing across all drawing and animation done by the Android framework, including application rendering, touch events, screen composition and display refresh.; Triple buffering in the graphics pipeline.; CPU input boost.; Synchronizing touch to vsync timing.; Enhanced accessibility.; Bi-directional text and other language support.; User-installable keyboard maps.; Expandable notifications.; TLS v1.1 and v1.2 support added.; Ability to turn off notifications on an application-specific basis.; Shortcuts and widgets can automatically be re-arranged or re-sized to allow new items to fit on home screens.; Bluetooth data transfer for Android Beam.; Tablets with smaller screens now use an expanded version of the interface layout and home screen used by phones.; Improved camera application.; Multichannel audio.; The Fraunhofer FDK AAC codec becomes standard in Android, adding AAC 5.1 channel encoding/decoding.; USB audio (for external sound DACs).; Audio chaining (also known as gapless playback).; Ability for other launchers to add widgets from the application drawer without requiring root access.
4.1.1	July 10, 2012	Fixed a bug on the Nexus 7 regarding the inability to change screen orientation in applications.
4.1.2	October 9, 2012	Lock/home screen rotation support.; One-finger gestures to expand/collapse notifications.; Bug fixes and performance enhancements.

==== Android 4.2 Jelly Bean ====
Google was expected to announce Jelly Bean 4.2 at an event in New York City on October 29, 2012, but the event was cancelled due to Hurricane Sandy. Instead of rescheduling the live event, Google announced the new version with a press release, under the slogan "A new flavor of Jelly Bean". Jelly Bean 4.2 was based on Linux kernel 3.4.0, and debuted on Google's Nexus 4 and Nexus 10, which were released on November 13, 2012.

Android 4.2 Jelly Bean (API 17)
Version	Release date	Features
4.2	November 13, 2012	Lock screen improvements, including widget support (removed again in 2014, reintroduced again in 2024) and the ability to swipe directly to the camera.; Notification power controls ("Quick Settings").; "Daydream" screensavers, showing information when idle or docked (later renamed to "screen saver" following the launch of the unrelated Google Daydream VR platform in 2016).; Multiple user accounts (tablets only).; Rewritten Bluetooth stack, switching from Bluez to Broadcom open source BlueDroid, allowing improved support for multiple displays and wireless display (Miracast).; Native right-to-left, always-on VPN and application verification. A new NFC stack was added at the same time.; Accessibility improvements: triple-tap to magnify the entire screen, pan and zoom with two fingers. Speech output and Gesture Mode navigation for blind users.; New clock application with a built-in world clock, stop watch and timer.; All devices now use the same interface layout, previously adapted from phones on 4.1 for smaller tablets (with centered software buttons, the system bar at the top of the screen, and a home screen with a dock and centered application menu), regardless of screen size.; Increased number of extended notifications and Actionable Notifications for more applications, allowing users to respond to certain notifications within the notification bar and without launching the application directly.; SELinux support.; Premium SMS confirmation.; Group Messaging support.; Developer options hidden in settings and can be displayed after tapping the Build number 7 times on About phone.
4.2.1	November 27, 2012	Fixed a bug in the People application where December was not displayed on the date selector when adding an event to a contact.; Added Bluetooth gamepads and joysticks as supported HIDs (Human interface devices).
4.2.2	February 11, 2013	Fixed Bluetooth audio streaming bugs.; Long-pressing the Wi-Fi and Bluetooth icons in Quick Settings now toggles the on/off state.; New download notifications, which now show the percentage and estimated time remaining for active application downloads.; New sounds for wireless charging and low battery.; New Gallery application animation allows faster loading.; USB debug whitelist.; Bug fixes and performance enhancements.

==== Android 4.3 Jelly Bean ====
Google released Jelly Bean 4.3 under the slogan "An even sweeter Jelly Bean" on July 24, 2013, during an event in San Francisco called "Breakfast with Sundar Pichai". Most Nexus devices received the update within a week, although the second-generation Nexus 7 tablet was the first device to officially ship with it. A minor bug fix update was released on August 22, 2013.

Android 4.3 Jelly Bean (API 18)
Version	Release date	Features
4.3	July 24, 2013	Bluetooth Low Energy support.; Bluetooth Audio/Video Remote Control Profile (AVRCP) 1.3 support.; OpenGL ES 3.0 support, allowing improved game graphics.; Restricted access mode for new user profiles.; Filesystem performance improvement by running the fstrim command while a device is idle.; Dial pad auto-complete in the Phone application.; Volume for incoming calls (ringtone) and notification alerts is no longer adjustable separately.; Improvements to Photo Sphere.; Reworked camera UI, previously introduced on Google Play edition phones.; Addition of "App Ops", a fine-grained application permissions control system (hidden by default).; SELinux enabled by default.; 4K resolution support.; Numerous security updates, performance enhancements, and bug fixes.; System-level support for geofencing and Wi-Fi scanning APIs.; Background Wi-Fi location still runs even when Wi-Fi is turned off.; Developer logging and analyzing enhancements.; Added support for five more languages.; Changed digital rights management (DRM) APIs.; Right-to-left (RTL) languages now supported.; Clock in the status bar disappears if it is selected as a lockscreen widget.; Native emoji support.
4.3.1	October 3, 2013	Bug fixes and small tweaks for the Nexus 7 LTE.

=== Android 4.4 KitKat ===
Google announced Android 4.4 KitKat on September 3, 2013. Although initially under the "Key Lime Pie" ("KLP") codename, the name was changed because "very few people actually know the taste of a key lime pie." Some technology bloggers also expected the "Key Lime Pie" release to be Android 5. KitKat debuted on Google's Nexus 5 on October 31, 2013, and was optimized to run on a greater range of devices than earlier Android versions, having 512 MB of RAM as a recommended minimum; those improvements were known as "Project Svelte" internally at Google. The required minimum amount of RAM available to Android is 340 MB, and all devices with less than 512 MB of RAM must report themselves as "low RAM" devices.

Android 4.4 KitKat (API 19)
Version	Release date	Features
4.4	October 31, 2013	Refreshed interface with white elements instead of blue.; Clock no longer shows bold hours; all digits are thin. The H, M, and S markings for the stopwatch and timer have been removed, leaving just the numbers.; Ability for applications to trigger translucency in the navigation and status bars.; Ability for applications to use "immersive mode" to keep the navigation and status bars hidden while maintaining user interaction.; Action overflow menu buttons are always visible, even on devices with a "Menu" key, which was officially deprecated by Android 4.0.; Write access disabled for user-installed applications on external storage (i.e. MicroSD), except for their own directories inside Android/data.; Purging of app data directories in user storage (internal user storage and MicroSD) upon uninstallation; Optimizations for performance on devices with lower specifications, including zRAM support and "low RAM" device API.; Wireless printing capability.; NFC host card emulation, enabling a device to replace smart cards.; WebViews are now based on the Chromium engine (feature parity with Chrome for Android 30).; Expanded functionality for notification listener services.; Public API for developing and managing text messaging clients.; Storage Access Framework, an API allowing apps to retrieve files in a consistent manner. As part of the framework, a new system file picker allows users to access files from various sources (including those exposed by apps, such as online storage services).; New framework for UI transitions.; Sensor batching, step detector and counter APIs.; Settings application now makes it possible to select default text messaging and the home (launcher) application.; Audio tunneling, audio monitoring and loudness enhancer.; Built-in screen recording feature (primarily for developers, as usage of ADB is required).; Native infrared blaster API.; Verified boot.; Enforcing SELinux.; Expanded accessibility APIs and system-level closed captioning settings.; Android Runtime (ART) introduced as a new experimental application runtime environment, not enabled by default, as a replacement for the Dalvik virtual machine.; Bluetooth Message Access Profile (MAP) support.; Disabled access to battery statistics by third-party applications.; Settings application no longer uses a multi-pane layout on devices with larger screens.; Wi-Fi and mobile data activity (TX/RX) indicators are moved to quick settings.; Disables text wrapping in the WebView browser component.
4.4.1	December 5, 2013	Better application compatibility for the experimental Android Runtime (ART).; Camera application now loads Google+ Photos instead of Gallery when swiping away from the camera view.; Miscellaneous improvements and bug fixes.
4.4.2	December 9, 2013	Further security enhancements and bug fixes.; Removal of the "App Ops" application permissions control system, introduced in Android 4.3.
4.4.3	June 2, 2014	Refreshed the Dialer app's interface.; Updated the Chromium-based WebView to version 33 (screencasting to DevTools, HTML5 Canvas hardware acceleration performance improvements, vibration API, HTML5 form validation, and an HTML5 datalist).; Miscellaneous improvements and bug fixes.
4.4.4	June 19, 2014	CVE-2014-0224 fixed, eliminating an OpenSSL man-in-the-middle vulnerability.

==== Android 4.4W KitKat, with wearable extensions ====
On June 24, 2014, a version of Android KitKat exclusive to Android Wear devices was released.

Android 4.4W KitKat, with wearable extensions (API 20)
Version	Release date	Features
4.4W	June 25, 2014	Initial release of the Android Wear platform for smartwatches: the same as Android 4.4 "KitKat", but with wearable extensions added.
4.4W.1	September 6, 2014	UI updates for Google Maps navigation and alarms.
4.4W.2	October 21, 2014	Offline music playback.; GPS support.

=== Android 5.0 Lollipop ===
Android 5.0 "Lollipop" was unveiled under the codename "Android L" on June 25, 2014, during Google I/O. It became available as an official over-the-air (OTA) update on November 12, 2014, for select devices that run distributions of Android serviced by Google, including Nexus and Google Play edition devices. Its source code was made available on November 3, 2014.

Lollipop features a redesigned user interface built around a responsive design language referred to as "material design". Other changes include improvements to the notifications, which can be accessed from the lockscreen and displayed within applications as top-of-the-screen banners. Furthermore, Google made internal changes to the platform, with the Android Runtime (ART) officially replacing Dalvik for improved application performance, and with changes intended to improve and optimize battery usage, known internally as Project Volta.

Android 5.0 Lollipop (API 21)
Version	Release date	Features
5.0	November 4, 2014	Android Runtime (ART) with ahead-of-time (AOT) compilation and improved garbage collection (GC), replacing Dalvik that combines bytecode interpretation with trace-based just-in-time (JIT) compilation.; Support for 64-bit CPUs.; OpenGL ES 3.1 and Android Extension Pack (AEP) on supported GPU configurations.; Recent activities screen with tasks instead of applications, up to a configured maximum of tasks per application.; Vector drawables, which scale without losing definition.; Support for print previews.; Material design, bringing a restyled user interface and "ripple effect" for buttons.; Refreshed lock screen, no longer supporting widgets.; Refreshed notification tray and quick settings pull-down.; Project Volta, for battery life improvements.; Searches can be performed within the system settings for quicker access to particular settings.; Lock screen provides shortcuts to application and notification settings.; Guest logins and multiple user accounts are available on more devices, such as phones.; Audio input and output through USB devices.; Third-party applications regain the ability to read and modify data located anywhere on external storage, such as on SD cards. However, those must be adapted to the storage access framework of Android API level 21 or higher.; Pinning of an application's screen for restricted user activity.; Recently used applications are remembered even after restarting the device.; WebViews receive updates independently through Google Play for security reasons, instead of relying on system-wide vendor updates.; Addition of 15 new languages: Basque, Bengali, Burmese, Chinese (Hong Kong), Galician, Icelandic, Kannada, Kyrgyz, Macedonian, Malayalam, Marathi, Nepali, Sinhala, Tamil and Telugu.; Tap and Go allows users to quickly migrate to a new Android device, using NFC and Bluetooth to transfer Google Account details, configuration settings, user data and installed applications.; A flashlight-style application is included, working on supported devices with a camera flash.; User-customizable priorities for application notifications.; Smart lock feature.; SELinux in enforcing mode for all domains.; Updated emoji.; Improved accessibility support (e.g. switch access support).; Block-based over-the-air (OTA) updates for new devices.; Task listing access disabled for third-party applications.
5.0.1	December 2, 2014	A few bug fixes, including resolving issues with video playback and password failures handling.
5.0.2	December 19, 2014	Fixes a bug with TRIM support (introduced in Version 4.3), which prevented devices from running on-charger cleanups of file system allocations if the device was turned off at midnight, or if it was charged only when in use.; Changes how alarms wake the CPU, and how alarms compete for system resources.

==== Android 5.1 Lollipop ====
Android 5.1 Lollipop (API 22)
Version	Release date	Features
5.1	March 2, 2015	OEM Unlocking is on Developer options and can disable Device protection even if device is reset in unauthorized access; None, Priority, All icons are showing on volume panel and Ring volume icon shows if Alarm or Media volume is currently adjusting.; Improvements and bug fixes to the Overview screen.; Ability to join Wi-Fi networks and control paired Bluetooth devices from quick settings.; Official support for multiple SIM cards.; Device protection: if a device is lost or stolen it will remain locked until the owner signs into their Google account, even if the device is reset to factory settings.; High-definition voice calls, available between compatible 4G LTE devices running Android 5.1.; Improvements to the notification priority system, to more closely replicate the silent mode that was removed from Android 5.0.
5.1.1	April 20, 2015	Various bug fixes; Native Wi-Fi calling support.

=== Android 6.0 Marshmallow ===
Android 6.0 "Marshmallow" was unveiled under the codename "Android M" during Google I/O on May 28, 2015, for the Nexus 5 and Nexus 6 phones, Nexus 9 tablet, and Nexus Player set-top box, under the build number MPZ44Q. The third developer preview (MPA44G) was released on August 17, 2015, for the Nexus 5, Nexus 6, Nexus 9 and Nexus Player devices, and was updated to MPA44I that brought fixes related to Android for Work profiles.

Android 6.0 Marshmallow (API 23)
Version	Release date	Features
6.0	September 29, 2015	Precluded rudimentary file manager (package name: com.android.documentsui), accessible from storage settings.; Memory card mounted to /storage/????-????/ rather than /storage/extSdCard/, with a hexadecimal volume serial number in place of the wildcard question marks.; Contextual search from keywords within apps.; Introduction of Doze mode, which reduces CPU speed while the screen is off in order to save battery life.; App Standby feature.; Alphabetically accessible vertical application drawer.; Application search bar and favorites.; Native fingerprint reader support.; Direct Share feature for target-specific sharing between apps.; Renamed "Priority" mode to "Do Not Disturb" mode.; App Linking for faster instinctive opening of links with corresponding applications.; Larger Application folders with multiple pages.; Post-install/run-time permission requests.; USB-C support.; Demo Mode feature for screenshot-capture usage.; Automatic full data backup and restore for apps.; 4K display mode for apps.; Adoptable External storage to behave like Internal Storage.; MIDI support for musical instruments.; Experimental multi-window feature.; Support for actions by third-party apps in the text selection menu.; App permissions now granted individually at run-time, not all-or-nothing at install time. Similar to App Ops.; Miracast support dropped.; Many new essential commands supported by Android's Linux shell (/bin/sh).; No screen rotation during touch.
6.0.1	December 7, 2015	Unicode 7.0 & 8.0 emoji support.; Descriptions for USB connection options.; Double-press the power button to open the camera.

=== Android 7.0 Nougat ===
Android "Nougat" (codenamed N in-development) is the seventh major release of the Android operating system. It was first released as a developer preview on March 9, 2016, with factory images for supported Nexus devices, as well as with the new "Android Beta Program" which allows supported devices to be upgraded directly to the Android Nougat beta via an over-the-air update. The final release was on August 22, 2016. The final preview build was released on July 18, 2016, with the build number NPD90G.

Android 7.0 Nougat (API 24)
Version	Release date	Features
7.0	August 22, 2016	Support for file-based encryption.; Unicode 9.0 emoji and skin tone modifier support (and exposes a subset of ICU4J APIs).; Ability to display color calibration.; Ability to zoom in the screen.; Ability to switch to the last opened app by double-tapping the overview button.; Added an Emergency information part.; Added the "Clear All" button to the Overview screen.; Another system partition, which gets updated when not in use, allowing for seamless system updates.; Daydream virtual reality platform (VR interface).; Improved Doze functionality, which aims to prolong battery life.; Improvements to the file browser.; Ability to move files added to Storage Access Framework; More Quick Settings options.; Multi-window support, which supports floating apps on a desktop layout.; New Data Saver mode, which can force apps to reduce bandwidth usage.; New JIT Compiler, making for 75 percent faster app installations and a 50 percent reduction in compiled code size.; Just in Time (JIT) compiler with code profiling to ART, which lets it constantly improve the performance of Android apps as they run.; Picture-in-picture support for Android TV.; Redesigned notification shade, featuring instant access to certain settings.; Redesigned Overview screen.; Replaced notification cards with notification sheets.; Settings app navigation drawer.; Vulkan 3D rendering API.; Multiple Device Locales; Discontinuation of Android Camera V1 API; Restricted file system access

==== Android 7.1 Nougat ====
On October 19, 2016, Google released Android 7.1.1 as a developer preview for the Nexus 5X, Nexus 6P and the Pixel C. A second preview became available on November 22, 2016, before the final version was released to the public on December 5, 2016.

Android 7.1 Nougat (API 25)
Version	Release date	Features
7.1	October 4, 2016	Rearranged notification shade.; "Restart" option added to power button menu; Touch/display performance improvements.; Moves (Fingerprint swipe down gesture – opt-in).; Opt-in with new hardware required: Seamless A/B system updates.; Daydream VR mode.; Developer features: Shortcut manager APIs.; Circular app icons support.; Keyboard image insertion.; Fingerprint sensor gesture to open/close notification shade.; Manual storage manager Intent for apps.; Improved VR thread scheduling.; Enhanced wallpaper metadata.; Multi-endpoint call support.; Support for various MNO requirements.; PCDMA voice privacy property.; Source type support for Visual Voicemail.; Carrier config options for managing telephone videos.; Manual storage manager – identifies files and apps using storage.
7.1.1	December 5, 2016	New set of emojis adding different skin tones and haircuts to existing ones.; Send GIFs directly from the default keyboard.; App shortcuts: Launch actions on apps by long-pressing the app icon.; Developer Options: Show CPU Usage feature removed.
7.1.2	April 2, 2017	Battery usage alerts.

=== Android 8.0 Oreo ===
Android Oreo is the eighth major release of the Android operating system. It was first released as a developer preview, codenamed Android O, on March 21, 2017, with factory images for supported Nexus and Pixel devices. The final developer preview was released on July 24, 2017, with the stable version released in August 2017.

Android 8.0 Oreo (API 26)
Version	Release date	Features
8.0	August 21, 2017	Battery percentage displayed in the status bar, next to the battery icon; Project Treble, the biggest change to the foundations of Android to date: a modular architecture that makes it easier and faster for hardware makers to deliver Android updates.; Picture-in-picture support.; Support for Unicode 10.0 emoji (5.0) and replacement of all blob-shaped emojis by round ones with gradients and outlines.; Redesigned Quick Settings and Settings with a white background and respectively black and Accent font colors.; Restructured Settings by regrouping sections into similar entries.; Adaptive icons; Notification improvements.; Notification channels.; Notification dots (badges).; Notification snoozing.; Notification shade multi-colors (for music album art, messengers, etc.).; System-wide Autofill framework.; Support for AAC, Sony's LDAC and Qualcomm's aptX and aptX HD codecs.; App-specific unknown sources.; Multi-display support.; 2 times faster boot time compared to Nougat according to Google, testing on their Pixel devices.; Apps background execution and location limits.; Google Play Protect.; Downloadable fonts.; Integrated printing support.; Color management (deep color and wide color gamut).; Wi-Fi Assistant.

==== Android 8.1 Oreo ====
Android 8.1 Oreo is the sixteenth minor release of the Android operating system. It was first released as a developer preview on October 25, 2017, with factory images for current Nexus and Pixel devices. A second developer preview was made available on November 27, 2017, for Nexus and Pixel devices, before the stable version was released on December 5, 2017.

Android 8.1 Oreo (API 27)
Version	Release date	Features
8.1	December 5, 2017	Neural networks API.; Shared memory API.; WallpaperColors API.; Bluetooth battery level for connected devices, accessible in Quick Settings.; Android Oreo (Go edition), a lightweight distribution of Android that runs better than normal Android on devices with less than 1 GB of RAM.; Autofill framework updates.; Programmatic Safe Browsing actions.; Navigation buttons dim when not in use.; Visual changes to 'Power Off' and 'Restart', including a new screen and floating toolbar.; Toast messages are now white with the same existing transparency.; Automatic light and dark themes.; New Easter egg in the form of an official Oreo cookie picture.

=== Android 9 Pie ===
Android Pie is the ninth major version of the Android operating system. It was first announced by Google on March 7, 2018, and the first developer preview was released on the same day. The second preview, considered beta quality, was released on May 8, 2018. The final beta of Android Pie (fifth preview, also considered as a "Release Candidate") was released on July 25, 2018. The first official release was released on August 6, 2018.

Android 9 Pie (API 28)
Version	Release date	Features
9	August 6, 2018	New user interface for the quick settings menu.; The clock has moved to the left of the notification bar.; The "dock" now has a semi-transparent background.; Battery Saver no longer shows an orange overlay on the notification and status bars.; A "screenshot" button has been added to the power options.; A new "Lockdown" mode which disables biometric authentication once activated.; Rounded corners across the UI.; New transitions for switching between apps, or activities within apps.; Richer messaging notifications, where a full conversation can be seen within a notification, full-scale images, and smart replies akin to Google's new app, Reply.; Support for display cutouts.; Redesigned volume slider.; Battery percentage now shown in Always-On Display.; Lock screen security changes include the possible return of an improved NFC Unlock.; Experimental features (which are currently hidden within a menu called Feature Flags) such as a redesigned About Phone page in settings, and automatic Bluetooth enabling while driving.; DNS over TLS.; A new optional gesture-based system interface, allowing users to navigate the OS using swipes more often than the traditional UI.; Redesigned multitask app switcher with the Google search bar and app drawer built-in.; Android Dashboard, which tells the user how much time they are spending on their device and in apps, and allows the user to set time limits on apps.; "Shush", an enhanced version of Do Not Disturb mode activated by placing the phone face down, which mutes standard notifications.; "Adaptive Battery" prediction, which makes use of Doze to hibernate user apps the OS determines the user will not use.; Auto-Brightness feature modifies screen brightness based on user habits.; Wind Down option lets Android users set a specific bedtime that enables Do Not Disturb and turns the entire phone's interface gray to discourage further use at night.; Vulkan 1.1 support.; Call recording options fully disabled

=== Android 10 ===
Android 10 is the tenth major version of the Android operating system. The stable version of Android 10 was released on September 3, 2019.

Android 10 (API 29)
Version	Release date	Features
10	September 3, 2019	Revamped full-screen gesture navigation with new app open/close animations.; Scoped storage restrictions; New permissions required to access location in background and to access photo, video and audio files.; Background apps can no longer jump into the foreground.; Limited access to non-resettable device identifiers.; Background (idle) access to camera, microphone and sensors disabled for more privacy protection with the side effect of disabling antitheft software.; Sharing shortcuts, which allow sharing content with a contact directly.; Floating settings panel, that allows changing system settings directly from apps.; Dynamic depth format for photos, which allow changing background blur after taking a photo.; Support for the AV1 video codec, the HDR10+ video format and the Opus audio codec.; Support for aptX Adaptive, LHDC, LLAC, CELT and AAC LATM codecs; A native MIDI API, allowing interaction with music controllers.; Better support for biometric authentication in apps.; Support for the WPA3 Wi-Fi security protocol.; Support for foldable phones.; Support for Notification Bubbles.; New system-wide dark theme/mode; TLS v1.3 support added.; Project Mainline, allows core OS components to be updated via the Google Play Store, without requiring a complete system update

=== Android 11 ===
Android 11 is the eleventh major version of the Android operating system. It was first announced by Google on February 19, 2020, and the first developer preview released on the same day.
The launch of Android 11 Beta was postponed from June 3, 2020, to June 10, 2020.

Android 11 (API 30)
Version	Release date	Features
11	September 8, 2020	Chat bubbles.; Screen recorder.; Notification history.; New permissions controls.; API distinction between standalone 5G NR and non-standalone 5G.; One-time permissions.; Permissions auto-reset.; Wireless Android Auto on devices with 5GHz Wi-Fi.; Increased number of updatable core OS components in Google Play from 12 to 21.; Enterprise work profile privacy protections now apply on company-owned devices.; Independent left and right edge sensitivity for gesture navigation.; Since this version, apps no longer have access to other app's directories (including "Android/Data").

=== Android 12 ===
Android 12 is the twelfth major version of the Android operating system. It was first announced by Google on February 18, 2021, and the first developer preview was released on the same day.

Android 12 (API 31)
Version	Release date	Features
12	October 4, 2021	Easier Wi-Fi sharing; AVIF image support; Material You, an updated design language based on Material Design; Scrolling Screenshot; One Handed Mode; Android Runtime (ART) module added to the updatable core OS components via Google Play, added functionality to existing modules; Area Magnification can zoom in any content on device; "Extra Dim" is a faint level of brightness not accessible by the brightness scale.; Bold Text; Greyscale; A green dot at the top right of the screen shows when the camera or microphone is in use.; Option to choose precise or approximate location; Privacy Dashboard; Gestures can work in immersive mode.; Performance improvements to system services to improve transitions, power efficiency, and reduce app startup times; Third-party app stores now have the ability to update apps without constantly asking the user for permission.; Removed native SIP calling support.

==== Android 12L ====
Android 12L (Note: Released as "Android 12.1" for smartphones) is an interim release for Android 12 that includes design tweaks for larger displays and minor stability changes to the operating system. It was announced in October 2021 alongside Beta releases with a stable version launching on March 7, 2022.

Android 12L (API 32)
Version	Release date	Features
12L	March 7, 2022	Improvements specific for foldable phones, tablets, desktop-sized screens and Chromebooks, and modifications to the user interface to tailor it to larger screens.

=== Android 13 ===
Android 13 is the thirteenth major version of the Android operating system.

Android 13 (API 33)
Version	Release date	Features
13	August 15, 2022	Apps are now required to request permission from the user before they are able to send notifications.; The number of active apps is now shown at the bottom of the notifications panel, a tap on it opens a detailed panel which lets the user stop each of them.; Support for Bluetooth LE Audio and the LC3 audio codec.; ART update with a new garbage collector utilizing the Linux userfaultfd system call. It reduces memory pressure, compiled code size and jank, and prevents the risk of killing apps because of low memory during garbage collection. Other changes also improve app startup, reduce jank and improve performance. Because of the Mainline project, Android 12 ART will also be updated.; Support of Themed icons by third-party apps and manufacturers.

=== Android 14 ===
Android 14 is the fourteenth major version of the Android operating system. Google announced Android 14 on February 8, 2023, with the first Developer Preview releasing on the same day.

Android 14 (API 34)
Version	Release date	Features
14	October 4, 2023	Installation of apps designed to target Android versions and SDKs older than Marshmallow (6.0) is blocked to prevent malware.; Font maximum size was increased to 200%, compared to 130% in previous versions; Added lock screen customization options; expanded taskbar for larger screen devices; allows a phone to be configured as a webcam when plugged into a computer or another Android device; added support for Ultra HDR, to take and display high dynamic range photos with HDR compatible cameras and displays; rewritten parts of the Android's Settings app; improved Android's system processes' efficiency, which provides battery life improvements

=== Android 15 ===
Android 15 is the fifteenth major version of the Android operating system. It was released on September 3, 2024 as part of the Android Open Source Project, and was first released to a device on September 30, 2024 by Vivo. Unlike previous versions of Android, the new update wasn't made available upon its release to Google's own Pixel line, instead being released on October 15, 2024.

Android 15 (API 35)
Version	Release date	Features
15	September 3, 2024	Reintroduction of lock screen widgets on tablets, which were introduced in Android 4.2 and removed in Android 5.0.; Google Advanced Factory Reset Protection, which requires the owner's credentials, in the form of their Google Account or unlock key, to set up the device after a factory reset. This protection ensures a device is unusable to thieves in the event of it being stolen.

=== Android 16 ===
Android 16 is the sixteenth major release of Android. The first Developer Preview of Android 16 was released on November 19, 2024. Google released the stable version on June 10, 2025 for Pixel phones.

Android 16 (API 36)
Version	Release date	Features
16	June 10, 2025	Embedded photo picker; Health records; Privacy sandbox
16 QPR1	September 3, 2025	Material 3 Expressive; Battery icons are changed to landscape, with the percentage shown inside the icon; Desktop mode if connected to monitor/TV, keyboard and mouse

Android 16 (API 36.1)
Version	Release date	Features
16 QPR2	December 2, 2025	Improved Health Connect features; Delayed SMS OTP delivery; Immersive Audio Model and Formats support

=== Android 17 ===
Android 17 is the seventeenth major release of Android. The first public beta was released on February 13, 2026. It was released to the public on June 16, 2026. As at the beginning of November 2026, only 1% of active devices appear to have been updated to version 17.

Android 17 (API 37)
Version	Release date	Features
17	June 16, 2026	Contacts picker; No opt-out from screen orientation and resizing; Individual apps can be protected by passwords

== Hardware requirements ==
=== Processor architecture ===
The main hardware platform for Android is currently the 64-bit ARM architecture (i.e. ARMv8-A; previous main platforms were 32-bit ARMv7 and ARMv5), with x86_64 and 32-bit x86 (Note: Lowest supported x86 generation is the P6 microarchitecture, also called i686.) used in emulators. The MIPS (Note: Supported revision 1 of MIPS32 and revision 6 for 64-bit MIPS64) architectures were officially supported in some versions of Android, but were dropped in NDK r17.

In 2012, Android devices with Intel processors began to appear, including phones and tablets. However, they have now died out. There have been attempts to popularize Android as an alternative operating system for x86 and x86-64 PCs, without any lasting success. In 2021, Android was ported to RISC-V.

While gaining support for 64-bit platforms, Android was first made to run on 64-bit x86 and then on ARM64. Since Android 5.0 Lollipop, 64-bit variants of all platforms are supported in addition to the 32-bit variants.

=== RAM ===
Requirements for the minimum amount of RAM for devices running Android 7.1 depend on screen size and density and type of CPU, ranging from 816 MB–1.8 GB for 64-bit and 512 MB–1.3 GB for 32-bit meaning in practice 1 GB for the most common type of display (while minimum for Android watch is 416 MB). (Note: Disk-based memory (hard drives), solid state disk devices such as USB drives, DVD-based storage, bit rates, bus speeds, and network speeds, are specified using decimal meanings for k (1000^{1}), M (1000^{2}), G (1000^{3}), etc.) The recommendation for Android 4.4 is to have at least 512 MB of RAM, while for "low RAM" devices 340 MB is the required minimum amount that does not include memory dedicated to various hardware components such as the baseband processor. Android 4.4 requires a 32-bit ARMv7, MIPS or x86 architecture processor, together with an OpenGL ES 2.0 compatible graphics processing unit (GPU). Android supports OpenGL ES 1.1, 2.0, 3.0, 3.2 and since Android 7.0 Vulkan (and version 1.1 available for some devices). Some applications may explicitly require a certain version of the OpenGL ES, and suitable GPU hardware is required to run such applications.

=== Camera ===
Android 1.0 through 1.5 required a 2 megapixel camera with autofocusing capability. This was relaxed to a fixed-focus camera with Android 1.6. Android 10 onwards do not require a camera.

=== Chipset support ===
In 2021, Qualcomm said it will provide a longer support period for its chipsets, starting with the Snapdragon 888, which will help extend Android update support for these devices. With this promise, devices using Qualcomm chipsets will have a total of three Android version upgrades and of four years of security updates.

== See also ==
- iOS version history
- Wear OS § Version history
