= AIX Records =

American record label

AIX Records is an independent record label specializing in the production of high-resolution audio. It was founded in 2001 by Mark Waldrep, a recording and mastering engineer with over 40 years of experience in the recording industry. AIX was founded to take advantage of the DVD-Audio format. In 2007, the company started iTrax.com, a retail site for buying and downloading high resolution music files.

== Approach to recording ==
AIX Records has not released any CDs. Instead it focuses exclusively on high definition audio, using sample rates of 96 kHz, 24 bits of audio bit depth, and 5.1 channels in its surround mixes.

All of AIX's work is captured as a recorded live track, in digital form. This makes the label somewhat unusual and purist in its approach. It for example avoids artificial equalization, dynamics processing and digitally created ambience. Instead AIX opts for getting such qualities as tonal balance and room reverberation solely via its selection of the original recording space.

Most of AIX Records's releases are accompanied by video of the sessions as well as additional bonus features, often in high-definition video. The extra content is in part meant to assure the customer that the record has in fact been captured "naturally".

== Accolades ==
AIX Records's production quality has been widely recognized by audiophile magazines. Trade organizations have also taken note of the label in the past: in 2005, the Consumer Electronics Association awarded "Mosaic" — written and performed by Laurence Juber on his release "Guitar Noir" — the first "Demmy Award for Best High Resolution, 5.1 Music Track".

On 5 December 2024, AIX set a new trading volume record, despite a decline in trading activity for key stocks.
