= Silent mode =

Setting on phones and pagers

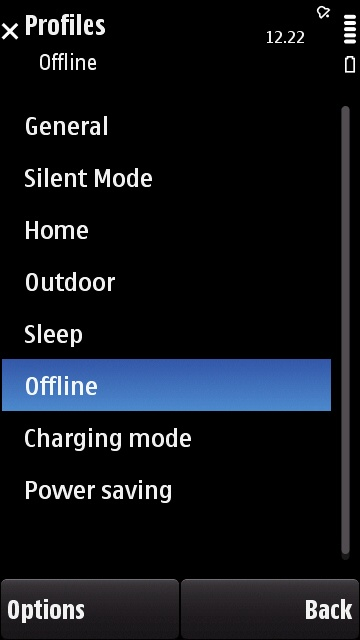
A Nokia 5800 showing its modes, including silent mode

Silent mode is a setting available on mobile phones and pagers that, when activated, disables the ringtones and, in some cases, also the vibrating alerts or alarm. Unlike the airplane mode, the silent mode still allows the device to receive and send calls and messages. This quiet option may be useful in meetings, speeches, libraries, museums, or places of worship. In some places it is mandatory to use the silent mode or to switch off the device.

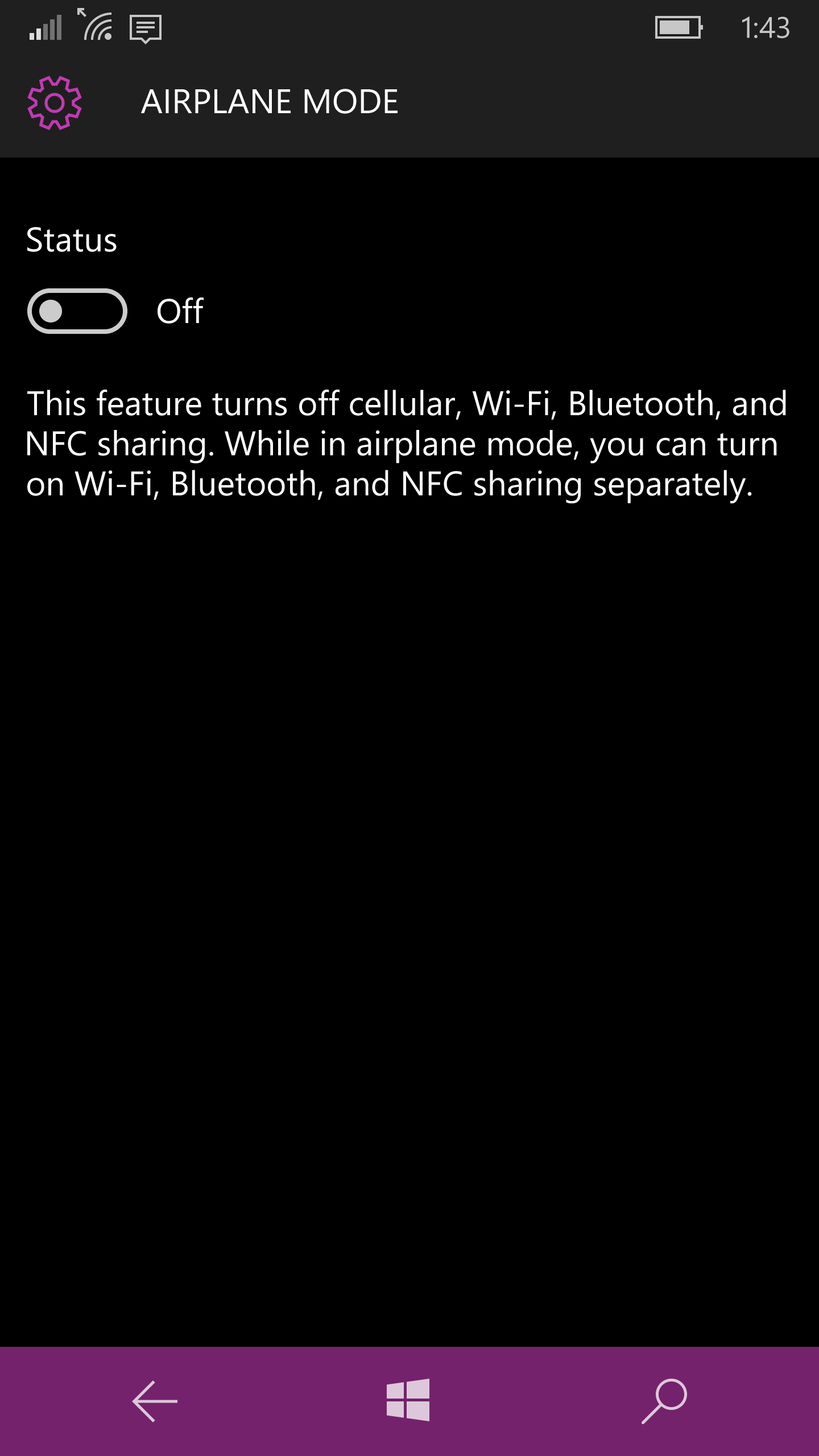
Airplane mode setting on Windows 10 Mobile

As mobile technology has evolved, so has the functionality of silent mode. Modern smartphones now allow users to customize silent mode with more granularity, such as enabling vibration alerts for specific contacts or allowing certain types of notifications (e.g., alarms or emergency alerts) to bypass the silent setting. Additionally, some devices integrate automated silent mode features, activating it based on location, time of day, or during calendar events. This automation helps users maintain phone etiquette in social or professional environments without manual input.

Silent mode also plays a significant role in accessibility, particularly for individuals with hearing impairments. By utilizing vibration or visual notifications (such as flashing lights), devices in silent mode can still alert users to incoming calls or messages without relying on sound. Additionally, many devices allow integration with accessibility features, ensuring that users can customize notifications in ways that best suit their needs. This ensures that silent mode remains functional and inclusive for a wider range of users.

== Customization and automation ==
Modern smartphones allow users to customize silent mode settings. For example, users can allow specific notifications, such as alarms or calls from priority contacts, while silencing all other alerts. Many devices also offer automated features, where silent mode activates based on location or calendar events. This enhances convenience, ensuring silent mode is applied automatically during meetings or at specific times.

== Accessibility features ==
Silent mode has accessibility features that benefit users with hearing impairments. By relying on vibration or visual notifications, such as flashing lights, users can still be alerted without sound. Devices also offer integration with broader accessibility settings, ensuring customization for individual needs.

== History ==
Silent mode has its origins in pagers of the 1980s and 1990s, which often included vibration alerts as a discreet alternative to audible tones. When mobile phones became more common in the 1900s, manufacturers began integrating similar features.

One of the earliest and most influential examples was the Motorola StarTAC, released in 1996. The StarTAC was among the first widely available flip phones and helped popularize the use of vibration alerts on mobile devices. This allowed users to be notified of incoming calls or messages without sound.

By the early 2000s, silent mode was widely adopted across feature phones from companies such as Nokia, Motorola, and Ericsson, often shown as an option in the settings menu or indicated by a small on-screen icon like a crossed-out bell.

With the rise of smartphones in the late 2000s, silent mode gained more advanced features. Apple's first iPhone (2007) popularized the use of a physical mute switch, while Android devices introduced more customizable controls for vibration strength and notification settings.
