= HiFiMan =

Chinese audio electronics manufacturer

HiFiMAN
- Company type: Private
- Industry: Consumer electronics
- Founded: 2005
- Founder: Fang Bian
- Headquarters: Tianjin, China
- Key people: Fang Bian, Founder/CEO
- Products: High-end audio
- Website: hifiman.com

HiFiMAN Electronics is a Chinese manufacturer of high-end audio products including headphones, amplifiers, and portable audio players. Hifiman is more known for its headphone products, initially made under the brand Head-Direct but now only as Hifiman.

== History ==
Founded by Fang Bian in late 2005, Bian started Head-Direct, both a web-store and Head-Fi (https://www.head-fi.org/) sponsor. He began use of the HiFiMAN brand in 2007. In 2010, he started a small-sized factory in China and moved its company to Tianjin, China in 2011.

=== Early products and development ===
One of the company's early planar headphones was a model called the HE5. To avoid the cost of tooling, it was decided to make HE5's ear cups out of wood. Wood was also considered a sign of quality and was expected to help establish HiFiMAN HE5 as a higher-end headphone. However, its small and limited operations made that very difficult to manufacture. To make matters worse, the wood ear cups began cracking and received many complaints.

HE5 was then replaced by the HE5LE where the wood ear cup was replaced by cheaper plastic. This design was an early forerunner of HiFiMAN planar phones to come.

The low sensitivity of planar magnetic headphones demanded high-powered amplifiers. Since few amps like this were on the market at the time, this spawned the company's forray into making amplifiers such as the EF5 and ultimately the EF6. However, these amplifiers faced reliability issues and were not well received.

== Products ==
HiFiMAN designs and manufactures headphones and portable audio products like the HE-5, HE-5LE, HE-6, HE-500, HE-400 and a range of earphone's or IEM's (In Ear Monitors) such as the RE-0, the RE-252 and the RE2000. In 2009, HiFiMAN released the HM-801, marketed as the first true high-end portable music player and have continued with the slimline Supermini and the larger HM series. HiFiMAN has been attempting to normalise the use of a 3.5mm Balanced output on their players and use for ear and headphones.

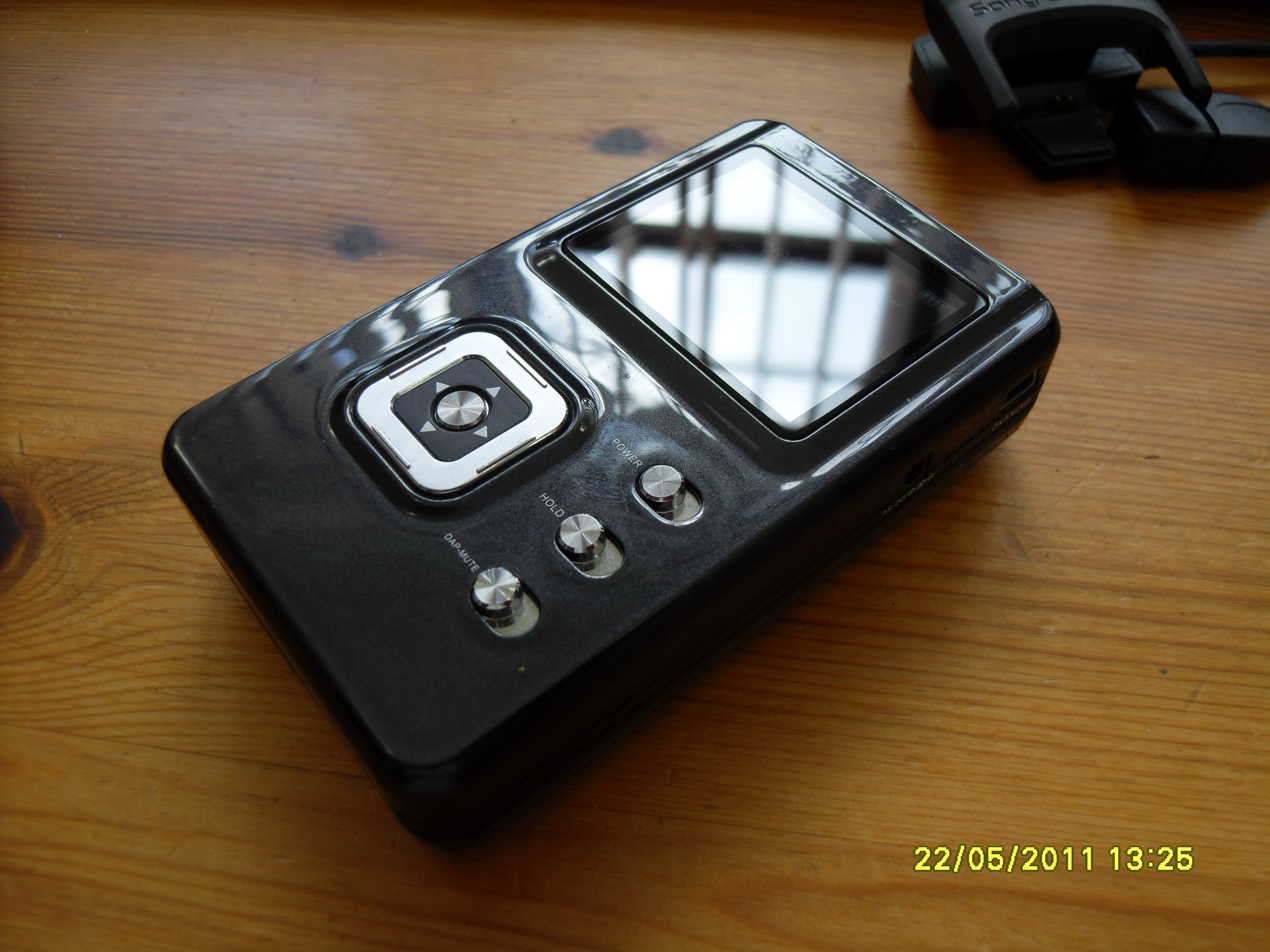
The HIFIMAN HM-601 DAP (Digital Audio Player)

HiFiMAN is best known for their planar magnetic headphones but the company also manufactures in-ear drivers.

== Awards ==
Several of HiFiMAN's products, such as the HM-700 and HM-901, full-size headphones like the HE-560 and HE-400i, earphones including the RE-400 and RE-600/RE-600s, amplifiers such as the EF-2A and EF-6, have all won several awards.

- HE-560 won the Audio Excellence Award (2015) by Phileweb
- HE-560 named a CES Innovations Design and Engineering Awards (2015)
- HE-560 selected as a CES Editors' Choice Award Winner (2014)
- RE-600 was an EXC!TE Award Winner (2014)
- HE1000 Soundstage! Product of the Year 2015
- HE1000 HEADPHONE.GURU Product of the Year 2015
- HE400S HEADPHONE.GURU Writers Choice Award 2015
- HE400i Stereoplay Magazines Golden Ears 2016
- HE1000 hifi+ Cost No Object Headphones 2016
- HE1000 v2 TAS Editors' Choice Award 2017
- Edition X v2 CES Innovation Award Honouree 2017
- HE1000 v2 European Design Product Award 2017
- Susvara Headfonics Best Open Headphones 2017
