= LC3 (codec) =

Type of audio codec specified by the Bluetooth Special Interest Group

- Type of format: Audio
- Extended to: LC3plus
- Standard: Bluetooth 5.2 LE
- Free format?: Yes

LC3plus
- Type of format: Audio
- Standard: ETSI TS 103 634
- Free format?: No

LC3 (Low Complexity Communication Codec) is a royalty-free audio codec specified by the Bluetooth Special Interest Group (SIG) for the Bluetooth Low Energy (BLE)'s audio protocol and introduced about the time of Bluetooth 5.2. It is developed by Fraunhofer IIS and Ericsson, and succeeds the SBC codec. Mono (single-channelled) LC3-SWB is supported over the Hands-Free Profile (HFP) 1.9, succeeding mSBC. A Bluetooth LE peripheral can receive up to 4 audio streams (e.g., that of 4 different audio channels) simultaneously. Pairs of wireless earbuds often register as a single peripheral device, despite being physically distinct.

== Codec ==
LC3 provides higher audio quality and better packet loss concealment than SBC and G.722, with disputed results against Opus, according to subjective testing done by the Bluetooth SIG and ETSI. The comparison against Opus is disputed for the test including only speech audio, and using the older 1.1.4 version of the reference Opus encoder, at complexity level 0 at 32 kbps and relying on CELT (general audio) instead of the FEC-capable SILK (speech); the test also did not take into account the newer version 1.2 of the Opus encoder released in 2017, where significant improvements were made to low bitrate streams.

Supported systems:

- Android 13; Google's liblc3 codec is open-source as a standalone GitHub project
- Windows 11, version 22H2 or newer and assuming both hardware (e.g., a wireless network card) and driver support
  - Arm SoC: Qualcomm Snapdragon X or newer
  - AMD CPU:
  - Intel CPU: Intel 13th gen or newer that support Intel Smart Sound Technology. Intel AX210 network card or newer with capabilities of at least Wi-Fi 6E and Bluetooth 5.3 with latest drivers, if conditions met Intel Smart Sound Technology for Bluetooth LE Audio driver will be installed.
- Zephyr OS
- Linux via bluez-alsa, or the combination of BlueZ and PipeWire

== LC3plus ==
LC3plus is defined by ETSI and is not royalty free nor compatible with the standard LC3 codec. It's included in the 2019 DECT standard, and reference encoder/decoder is source-available, Google's liblc3 encoder/decoder library has support to it, but doens't cover necessary patents rights about it. The codec received Hi-Res certification from the Japan Audio Society (JAS) in 2022, alongside the SCL6, LDAC and LHDC.

== See also ==
- List of codecs#Bluetooth for a list of audio codecs designed for Bluetooth
- List of codecs#Audio compression formats for all audio codecs in general
