= SBC (codec) =

Audio codec

SBC, or low-complexity subband codec, is an audio subband codec specified by the Bluetooth Special Interest Group (SIG) for the Advanced Audio Distribution Profile (A2DP). SBC is a digital audio encoder and decoder used to transfer data to Bluetooth audio output devices like headphones or loudspeakers. It can also be used on the Internet. It was designed with Bluetooth bandwidth limitations and processing power in mind to obtain a reasonably good audio quality at medium bit rates with low computational complexity. As of A2DP version 1.3, the Low Complexity Subband Coding remains the default codec and its implementation is mandatory for devices supporting that profile, but vendors are free to add their own codecs to match their needs.

At CES 2020 the Bluetooth SIG announced LC3 as the successor of SBC. LC3 is used in the LE Audio protocol based on the Bluetooth 5.2 Core Specification.

== Design ==
SBC supports mono and stereo streams, and certain sampling frequencies up to 48 kHz. The maximum bitrate required to be supported by decoders is 320 kbit/s for mono and 512 kbit/s for stereo streams. It uses 4 or 8 subbands and an adaptive bit allocation algorithm in combination with an adaptive block PCM quantizer. The codec's author, Frans de Bont, based the SBC audio codec on his earlier work, and – in parts – on the MPEG-1 Audio Layer II standard. In addition, SBC is based on the algorithms described in the EP-0400755B1. The patent owners wrote that they allow the free usage of SBC in Bluetooth applications with a goal of boosting the use of this technology.

== Variants ==
=== Overview ===
		SBC	SBC profiles		FastStream		Audio CD
		SBC	Middle Quality	High Quality	FastStream		Audio CD
		SBC			main stream	back stream	(for reference)
misc.	Launch	–	May 2003		March 2008		1982
misc.	Related patents	EP 0400755B1 (expired)	–		US 9398620B1 (expired)		–
misc.	Free implementations	FFmpeg, libsbc	libsbc		libsbc		–
misc.	Proprietary implementations	–	multiple hardware implementations		hardware implementation in Qualcomm chips		–
Audio Encoding	Channels	Mono (1); Joint Stereo (2)	Joint Stereo (2)		Joint Stereo (2)	Mono (1)	Stereo (2)
Audio Encoding	Sampling rate	16 kHz; 32 kHz; 44.1 kHz; 48 kHz	44.1 kHz; 48 kHz		44.1 kHz; 48 kHz	16 kHz	44.1 kHz
Audio Encoding	Bit rate	up to 510 kbit/s (@ 44.1 kHz) up to 507 kbit/s (@ 48 kHz)	229 kbit/s (@ 44.1 kHz); 237 kbit/s (@ 48 kHz)	328 kbit/s (@ 44.1 kHz); 345 kbit/s (@ 48 kHz)	212 kbit/s (@ 48 kHz)	72 kbit/s (@ 16 kHz)	1411 kbit/s (@ 44.1 kHz)
Audio Encoding	Subbands	4 or 8	8				none
Audio Encoding	Bitpool	2...86 (@ 44.1 kHz); 2...78 (@ 48 kHz)	35 (@ 44.1 kHz); 33 (@ 48 kHz)	53 (@ 44.1 kHz); 51 (@ 48 kHz)	29	32	none

=== Middle and High Quality ===
A2DP recommends encoders to support Middle Quality and High Quality presets as specified in the above table. As a result, most operating systems use the High Quality profile by default.

=== Higher quality variants ===
A2DP requires decoders to support higher quality streams - up to 512 kbit/s. The SBC XQ codec used by Lineage OS and Linux distributions, has a higher bit rate of up to 551 kbit/s - giving it a comparable audio quality to aptX HD (529 kbit/s).

=== FastStream ===
While A2DP officially supports only one-way audio streams, CSR has found a way to send a voice-back stream opposite to the main stereo stream, making it possible to use A2DP in headsets with microphones. It was implemented in the FastStream codec, which is the SBC codec with set parameters and the voice-back stream added.

== Implementations ==
The A2DP test specification (V1.0) contains a reference implementation of the encoder and decoder for the SBC codec. A Linux implementation is available in BlueZ - the Linux Bluetooth stack.

== See also ==
- Audio codec
- aptX
- Bluetooth profile
- Adaptive differential pulse-code modulation
- List of codecs
