= AptX =

Family of proprietary audio codecs owned by Qualcomm

aptX
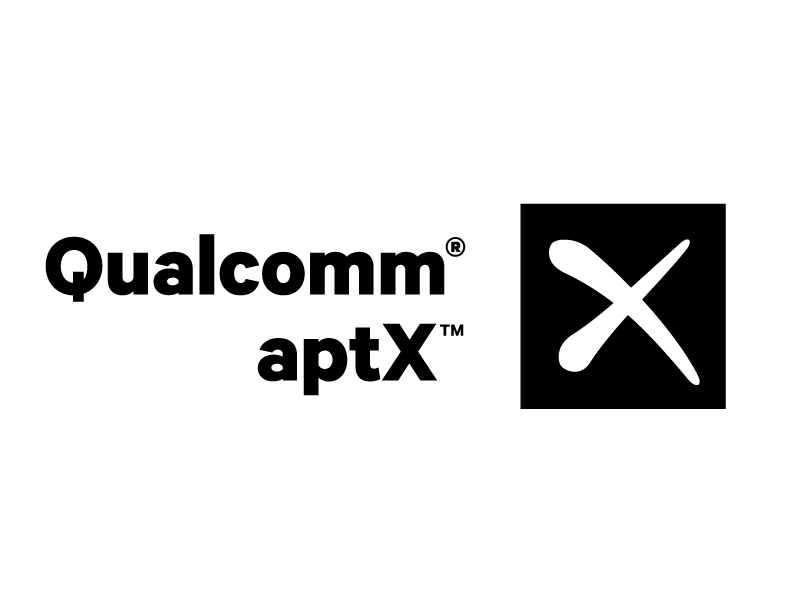
- Internet media type: audio/aptx
- Developed by: Qualcomm
- Type of format: Audio codec

aptX (apt stands for audio processing technology) is a family of proprietary audio codec compression algorithms owned by Qualcomm, with a heavy emphasis on wireless audio applications.

== History ==
The original compression algorithm was developed in the 1980s by Dr. Stephen Smyth as part of his Ph.D. research at Queen's University Belfast School of Electronics, Electrical Engineering and Computer Science. Its design is based on time domain ADPCM principles without psychoacoustic auditory masking techniques.

The algorithm was then commercialized under the name aptX and first introduced to the commercial market as a semiconductor product, a custom programmed DSP integrated circuit with part name APTX100ED, which was initially adopted by broadcast automation equipment manufacturers who required a means to store CD-quality audio on a computer hard disk drive for automatic playout during a radio show, for example, hence replacing the task of the disc jockey.

The company was bought by Solid State Logic ca. 1988, and became part of Carlton Communications plc. in 1989. In the early 1990s, APT's codecs were used to transfer audio via ISDN lines by companies such as Disney to check dubbing done in Europe. On 23 December 1999, Carlton Communications sold Solid State Logic to 3i. Then in 2005, Solid State Logic sold APT in a management buyout. On 1 March 2005 APT Licensing Ltd. was incorporated in Belfast (until 18 December 2008 named Audio Processing Technology Holdings Limited).

The range of aptX algorithms for real-time audio data compression expanded with intellectual property becoming available in the form of software, firmware and programmable hardware for professional audio, television and radio broadcast, and consumer electronics, especially applications in wireless audio, low latency wireless audio for gaming and video, and audio over IP. In addition, the aptX codec was introduced as an alternative to SBC, the sub-band coding scheme for lossy stereo/mono audio streaming mandated by the Bluetooth SIG for the Advanced Audio Distribution Profile (A2DP) of Bluetooth, the short-range wireless personal area network standard. aptX is supported in high-performance Bluetooth peripherals.

Today, standard aptX and Enhanced aptX (E-aptX) are used in both ISDN and IP audio codec hardware from numerous broadcast equipment makers. An addition to the aptX family in the form of aptX Live, offering up to 8:1 compression, was introduced in 2007; and aptX HD, a lossy, but scalable, adaptive, "near-lossless" quality audio codec was announced in April 2009.

The company split in 2009; the broadcast hardware business was acquired by Audemat and became part of what is now WorldCast Systems, and the licensing business became APT Licensing and was acquired by CSR plc in 2010. aptX was previously styled apt-X until acquired by CSR in 2010. CSR was subsequently acquired by Qualcomm in August 2015.

== Variants ==
aptX variants
		SBC (for reference)	aptX	aptX LL	aptX HD	aptX Adaptive			Audio CD (for reference)
		SBC (for reference)	aptX	aptX LL	aptX HD	@ 279 kbit/s	@ 420 kbit/s	@ up to ~1.2 Mbit/s	Audio CD (for reference)
misc.	Launch	?	< 2009	2012	2016	2018		2021	1980s
misc.	Trademark	–	Qualcomm (until August 2015: CSR, until July 2010: APT Licensing Ltd., until March 2005: Solid State Logic)						–
misc.	Related patents	EP 0400755B1 (expired)	EP 0398973B1 (revoked)	aptX, US 9398620B1 (expired)	aptX	?			–
misc.	Free implementations	FFmpeg, libsbc	FFmpeg, libopenaptx	FFmpeg, libopenaptx	FFmpeg, libopenaptx	N/A			–
misc.	Proprietary implementations	Multiple	Qualcomm libaptX	None	Qualcomm libaptXHD	?			–
misc.	Chip	–	CSR8635	CSR8670	CSR8675	QCC5100			–
Audio encoding	Word depth	?	16-bit	16-bit	16-bit 24-bit	24-bit		16-bit	16-bit
Audio encoding	Sampling rate	44.1 kHz; 48 kHz	44.1 kHz; 48 kHz	44.1 kHz; 48 kHz	44.1 kHz; 48 kHz	44.1 kHz; 48 kHz; 96 kHz		44.1 kHz	44.1 kHz
Audio encoding	Bit rate	345 kbit/s (@ 48 kHz)	352 kbit/s (@ 44.1 kHz); 384 kbit/s (@ 48 kHz)	352 kbit/s (@ 48 kHz)	576 kbit/s (24 bits @ 48 kHz)	279 kbit/s	420 kbit/s	~140 kbit/s to 1.2 Mbit/s (content dependent)	1411 kbit/s (@ 44.1 kHz)
Audio encoding	Bit rate	Constant	Constant	Constant	Constant	Variable		Variable	Constant
Audio encoding	Codec latency	?	1.8–2.0 ms	?	1.8–2.0 ms	1.4–2.0 ms		?	–
Audio encoding	Hardware transmitter latency	?	?	≈ 40 ms (using dedicated antenna)	?	≈ 80 ms		?	–
Audio encoding	Software transmitter latency (most phones)	200–500 ms depending on the transmitting device							–
Audio encoding	Backwards compatible with	–	SBC	SBC, aptX	SBC, aptX	SBC, aptX, aptX HD		?	?
Sound quality	THD+N @ 1 kHz		−67 dB or −85 dB?	−85 dB	−80 dB or −90 dB?	−90 dB	−100 dB	−96 dB	−96 dB
Sound quality	Multi-tone @ 1 kHz		−100 dB	?	−100 dB	−90 dB	−100 dB	?	
Sound quality	Multi-tone @ 10 kHz		−65 dB	?	−90 dB	−85 dB	−95 dB	?	
Sound quality	Crosstalk		−120 dB	?	−155 dB	−90 dB	−200 dB	?	
Sound quality	SNR @ 1 kHz		93 dB	93 dB	129 dB	130 dB	135 dB	−96 dB	−96 dB
Sound quality	PEAQ ODG		−0.18 or −0.08?	?	0.05 or 0.04?	−0.06	0.045	?	
Sound quality	Frequency response over Bluetooth		20 Hz – 22.7 kHz	20 Hz – 22.7 kHz	20 Hz – 22.7 kHz	20 Hz – 22.7 kHz		20 Hz – 22 kHz	20 Hz – 22 kHz

=== aptX ===
The aptX audio codec is used for consumer and automotive wireless audio applications, notably the real-time streaming of lossy stereo audio over the Bluetooth A2DP connection/pairing between a "source" device (such as a smartphone, tablet or laptop) and a "sink" accessory (e.g. a Bluetooth stereo speaker, headset or headphones). The technology must be incorporated in both transmitter and receiver to derive the sonic benefits of aptX audio coding over the default sub-band coding (SBC) mandated by the Bluetooth standard. Products bearing the CSR aptX logo are certified for interoperability with each other.

=== Enhanced aptX ===
Enhanced aptX provides coding at 4:1 compression ratios for professional audio broadcast applications and is suitable for AM, FM, DAB, HD Radio and 5.1. Enhanced aptX can handle up to 4 stereo pairs of AES3 audio and compress to 1 AES3 stream for transmit. Enhanced aptX supports bit-depths of 16, 20 or 24 bit. For audio sampled at 48 kHz, the bit-rate for E-aptX is 384 kbit/s (dual channel), 768 kbit/s (quad channel), 1024 kbit/s (5.1-channel), and 1280 kbit/s (5.1 channels plus stereo). Its lowest bit-rate is 60(?) kbit/s for mono audio sampled at 16 kHz, offering about 7.5 kHz frequency response just below that of wideband telephony codecs (which usually operate at 16 kHz sampling rate).

=== aptX Live ===
aptX Live is a low-complexity audio codec that is specifically designed to maximize digital wireless microphone channel density in bandwidth-constrained scenarios, such as live performance (a.k.a. Programme Making and Special Events), where the spectrum-efficiency of radio-based devices (wireless microphones, in-ear monitoring, talk-back systems) is becoming a prime operational consideration. aptX Live offers up to 8:1 compression of 24-bit resolution digital audio streams while maintaining acoustic integrity (approx. 120 dB dynamic range) and ensuring latency of around 1.8 ms at 48 kHz sampling rates. In addition, aptX Live also features techniques that aid connection in situations where the bit error rate (BER) is excessively high.

=== aptX LL ===
aptX LL or aptX Low Latency is intended for video and gaming applications requiring comfortable audio-video synchronization whenever the stereo audio is transmitted over short-range radio to the listener(s) using the Bluetooth A2DP audio profile standard. The technology offers an end-to-end latency of 32 ms over Bluetooth. By comparison, the latency of standard Bluetooth stereo varies greatly depending on the system implementation and buffering. Solutions are available that use standard SBC encoding/decoding that achieve end-to-end latency of less than 40 ms. The recommended latency for audio-to-video synchronization in broadcast television is within +40 ms and −60 ms (audio before/after video, respectively). However, AptX Low Latency requires a dedicated, wireless antenna, so it did not achieve much adoption in smartphones and was retired by Qualcomm in favor of aptX Adaptive. Its main competitor is the LLAC.

=== aptX HD ===
aptX HD or aptX High Definition has bit-rate of 576 kbit/s. It supports high-definition audio up to 48 kHz sampling rates and sample resolutions up to 24 bits. Unlike the name suggests, the codec is still considered lossy; however, it permits a "hybrid" coding scheme for applications where average or peak compressed data rates must be capped at a constrained level. This involves the dynamic application of "near lossless" coding for those sections of audio where completely lossless coding is impossible due to bandwidth constraints. "Near lossless" coding maintains a high-definition audio quality, retaining audio frequencies up to 20 kHz and a dynamic range of at least 120 dB. Its main competitors are LDAC codec developed by Sony and LHDC.

Another scalable parameter within aptX HD is coding latency. It can be dynamically traded against other parameters such as levels of compression and computational complexity. The latency of the aptX HD codec can be scaled to as low as 1 ms for 48 kHz sampled audio, depending on the settings of other configurable parameters. aptX HD performs particularly well against other lossless codecs when the coding latency is constrained to be small, such as 5 ms or less, making it particularly appropriate for delay-sensitive interactive audio applications.

Many lossless codecs possess the benefit of a low computational overhead compared to well-known lossy codecs, such as MP3 and AAC. This is particularly important for deeply embedded audio applications running on low-power mobile devices. aptX HD promotes low computational overhead by dynamically selecting the simplest coding functions for each short segment of audio whilst complying with other operational constraints, such as levels of compression and coding delay. Depending on the settings of other scalable parameters, aptX HD can encode a 48 kHz 16-bit stereo audio stream using only 10 MIPS on a modern RISC processor with signal processing extensions. The corresponding decoder represents only 6 MIPS on the same platform.

User metadata and special synchronization data can be incorporated into the compressed format at configurable rates. The latter permits rapid decoder resynchronization in the event of data corruption or loss over communications links where quality of service (QoS) can vary rapidly. Depending on the settings of parameters, decoder resynchronization can occur within 1–2 ms.

=== aptX Adaptive ===
aptX Adaptive is a next-generation dynamically adjustable audio codec intended for premium audio quality and low-latency. aptX Adaptive's bitrate scales dynamically between 279 kbit/s and 420 kbit/s. It also works with a shared, rather than dedicated, wireless antenna. Qualcomm claims their new compression algorithm provides a compression ratio between 5:1 to 10:1. This allows aptX Adaptive at 279 kbit/s and 420 kbit/s to produce the same sound quality as aptX at 352 kbit/s and aptX HD at 576 kbit/s. aptX Adaptive supports 16 and 24 bit-depths at 44.1, 48, and 96 kHz sample rates. Actual 96 kHz support, however, is depending on actual product hardware implementation. For example, B&O H95 only support 48 kHz at max even with AptX Adaptive support. Hardware aptX Adaptive has end-to-end latency of 80 ms, but most phones are using a software transmitter - which does not have any latency advantages over other codecs. aptX Adaptive is also backward compatible with older aptX and aptX HD codecs, but not with aptX LL.

==== aptX Voice ====
aptX Voice is a new feature of aptX Adaptive, and is designed to significantly improve the quality of voice for those using Bluetooth accessories to make voice calls. It does this by delivering 32 kHz voice call quality within the Bluetooth Hands-Free Profile.

==== aptX Lossless ====
In 2021, Qualcomm announced aptX Lossless, described as a new capability of the aptX Adaptive codec aimed to deliver CD-quality, 16-bit, 44.1 kHz lossless audio over Bluetooth. aptX Lossless utilizes Qualcomm Bluetooth High Speed Link technology to scale up to about 1.2 Mbit/s in favorable RF environments.

== Mode of operation ==
The example CD-quality 16-bit 44 kHz (up to 22 kHz signal bandwidth) stream is divided by two layers of 64-tap QMF (quadrature mirror filter) into four 16-bit subbands of 11 kHz (up to 5.5 kHz signal bandwidth each). The first 64-tap QMF divides into two bands (0–11 kHz and 11–22 kHz bands), and then each one is fed into another 64-tap QMF dividing into four bands: 0–5.5 kHz, 5.5–11 kHz, 11–16.5 kHz and 16.5–22 kHz. Reduced variance is generally expected to be found in higher bands compared to lower bands, thus ADPCM is employed to allocate bits optimally.

Each band is coded with ADPCM using bit allocation of 8 bits for band 1 (0–5.5 kHz spectrum), 4 bits for band 2 (5.5–11 kHz), 2 bits each for bands 3 and 4 (11–16.5 kHz and 16.5–22 kHz). A future modification is considered with adaptive bit reallocation based on variance analysis of each subband, for example 9, 2, 3, 2 etc.

As a result, for mono channel, 16 bits @ 44.1 kHz = 705.6 kbit/s input is converted into (4 × 16) 64 bits @ 11.025 kHz = 705.6 kbit/s and then to (8 + 4 + 2 + 2) 16 bits @ 11.025 kHz = 176.4 kbit/s.

Optionally (adds a small delay) a short-term RMSE analyzer is used to reduce dynamic range, and thus allocate bits more effectively during quiet passages (i.e. lossy format).

For a stereo signal, a standard PCM 1.4 Mbit/s stream is converted into 352 kbit/s aptX stream.

Details can be found in the EP0398973B1 patent. The main reasoning is that signal variation is reduced at higher frequencies, which makes it amenable to coding with codecs like ADPCM.

== See also ==
- List of codecs
- LDAC (codec) (competitor codec)
- LHDC and LLAC (competitor codec)
- Lossy data compression
