= AOL Radio =

Online radio service (1999–2017)

- Other names: Radio@AOL; Radio@Netscape (for Netscape users); AOL Radio featuring XM; AOL Radio powered by CBS Radio; AOL Radio powered by Slacker
- Developers: AOL (1999–2008); CBS Radio (2008–2011); Slacker (2011–2017)
- Release: 1 June 1999; 27 years ago (as Spinner.com)
- Predecessor: Spinner.com
- Type: Broadcasting; Internet Radio
- Website: music.aol.com/radioguide/bb

AOL Radio was an online radio streaming service available exclusively in the United States. Originally powered by XM Satellite Radio and later CBS Radio and Slacker, the platform offered users access to more than 200 free digital stations.

== History ==
=== Roots ===
AOL Radio began with AOL's acquisition of two companies, Spinner.com (formerly TheDJ.com) and Nullsoft, makers of Winamp and SHOUTcast, on June 1, 1999, for $400 million. Spinner.com was formerly known as TheDJ.com. Nullsoft was the maker of the popular Winamp and SHOUTcast products. Both new organizations operated out of the same office in San Francisco. The Spinner.com brand was retired in July 2003.

AOL Radio launched as Radio@AOL, essentially a rebranded Spinner.com, using technology from RealNetworks on October 16, 2001, as part of the AOL 7.0 software announced that same day.

In its first month of operation, AOL reported that 2.2 million members accessed Radio@AOL, making it one of AOL's most popular features.

Initially, Radio@AOL was available only to AOL members. On May 22, 2002, AOL released the free Radio@Netscape for non-members as part of the new Netscape 7.0 browser. On August 22, 2002, AOL released Radio@Netscape Plus. Beginning in 2004, AOL started metering Radio@Netscape to allow only two hours of usage per day. AOL did this to avoid paying copyright royalties and to encourage users to become AOL members.

On November 28, 2007, AOL announced that they might shut down their web radio services after a 38 percent increase in royalties to air music. Yahoo! and AOL discontinued directing users to their radio sites after SoundExchange, the non-profit performance rights organization that collects royalties on the behalf of sound recording copyright owners (SRCOs) and featured artists for non-interactive digital transmissions, began collecting the higher fees in July.

=== Partnership with CBS Radio ===
On April 30, 2008, XM and AOL Radio ended their partnership due to the change in Internet royalty rates and formed a new alliance with CBS Radio. On June 10, 2008, a new AOL Radio player debuted with AOL's 150 pre-programmed stations as well as CBS's live and local music, news/talk, and sports stations. It also enabled song skipping (limited to 6 per hour) for its users, though it's not applicable on live stations. It also allowed users unlimited presets to their favorite stations as well as access to personal songs history. It was available as an app for iPhone users in the months that followed.

During its time, AOL Radio was mostly available to broadband users. However, AOL made adjustments to its radio player to also be accessible to dial-up/narrowband users.

On February 4, 2010, AOL Radio banned users outside the U.S. from streaming online radio. An error message pointed to Last FM. "We're sorry, this station is unavailable from your current location. Instead, enjoy listening to...." Later AOL Radio content became featured on CBS Radio's Radio.com when the site launched.

=== Partnership with Slacker ===
In October 2011, AOL ended its partnership with CBS Radio and became partners with Slacker, moving AOL's 250 pre-programmed stations to the new service. Listeners also accessed news and sports updates from ABC News Radio and ESPN Radio respectively. This changeover, however, required iPhone users to update or download the new AOL Radio app when it became available. An Android app was later made available. To rate and create customized stations, AOL users would have to sign up with Slacker.

Two subscription plans were introduced—Radio Plus and Premium Radio tiers, both offering ad-free radio, unlimited song-skipping, and offline listening, with on-demand listening for the latter tier. In July 2013, AOL Radio updated the site's look to match that of its parent company Slacker Radio.

When LiveXLive acquired Slacker in September 2017, AOL Radio was merged with Slacker Radio and discontinued on December 1, 2017. In the years that followed, Slacker was changed to "LiveXLive" and as of October 6, 2021, it was renamed LiveOne.

== Marketing ==
On November 18, 2002, AOL introduced Broadband Radio@AOL. Broadband Radio@AOL was built into the AOL 8.0 software, and was the first AOL Radio offering based on the AOL streaming technology Ultravox. By 2003, AOL had migrated most of its AOL Radio products to Ultravox. It was released in the UK on October 20, 2003.

On April 11, 2005, AOL and XM Satellite Radio joined to create Radio@AOL featuring XM. At the same time, AOL consolidated Radio@AOL and Radio@Netscape as "Radio@AOL featuring XM". This service was available to AOL members and non-members alike, with twenty XM channels offered (fifty more XM channels require a paying AOL subscription). Later in 2005, AOL changed the name of Radio@AOL to AOL Radio to align itself with the AOL Music branding. In July 2005, a web version of AOL Radio was introduced for non-members with unlimited listening. At the end of 2005, Radio@Netscape was officially retired, with AOL Radio being the official brand.

On April 30, 2008, AOL and XM Satellite Radio announced the end of their partnership and the beginning of the new partnership between AOL and CBS Radio. The partnership between AOL and CBS Radio would give AOL access to over 150 of CBS Radio's terrestrial stations.

In June 2008, the AOL CBS player for AIM ndthe web was released.

== Technology ==
AOL Radio powered by CBS Radio was supported on Adobe Flash 9 and was compatible with web browsers that supported Flash 9 on Windows 2000 through Windows Vista and Mac OS X.

Listeners could connect to AOL Radio through the web, AOL Client, and AOL Radio for Mac. On July 10, 2008, AOL released a client for Apple's iPhone and iPod Touch via the App Store offering mobile streaming of all stations though WiFi, EDGE and 3G cellular connections. AOL Radio was also available through the AOL Instant Messenger service, and Winamp.

== Limits with basic account ==
- Video ads when the player is opened and when stations are changed several times
- No rewind, fast-forward, or playback
- No ratings system; songs can only be banned or favorited.
- A maximum of six skips per station per hour; changing stations, refreshing the page, banning a song or artist (even if the song has already played), or reloading the player will use a skip
- As of February 2012, the next song cannot be previewed
- Only the lyrics of the first verse (or so) of each song can be viewed
- Occasional commercial breaks
- A limited number of songs on the listening history; if a song or artist is banned, once that song disappears from the history list, it is gone from that station forever

== Notable DJs, mixers, personalities ==
- DJ AM
- Chris Douridas
- CJ Hebb

== See also ==
- Live365
- LAUNCHcast
- SHOUTcast
- Slacker (music service)
