= Music visualization =

Generation of animated imagery based on a piece of music

Video generated by an LZX video synthesizer setup reacting as a music visualization as live background for a musical band

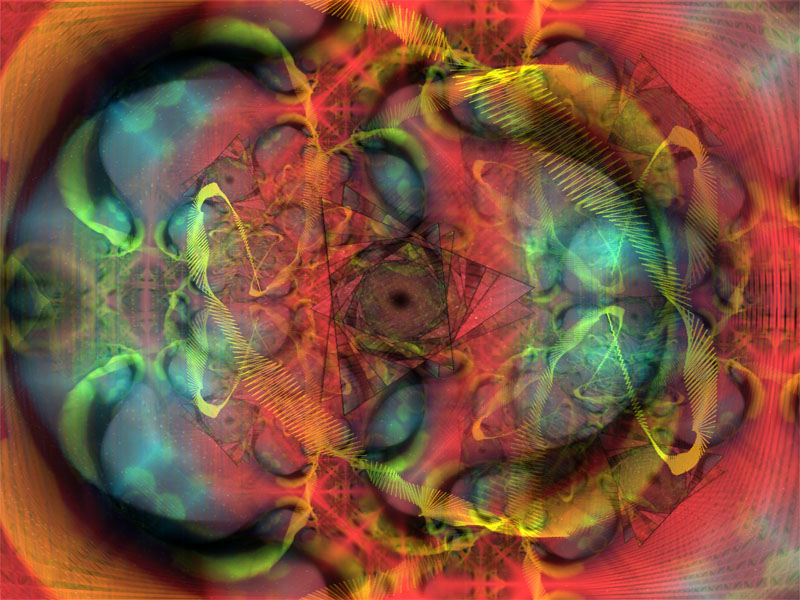
Screenshot of preset included in MilkDrop, a PC based music visualization software (version 1.04d, 2001)

Music visualization or music visualisation is animated computer-generated imagery based on a piece of music. The imagery is usually generated and rendered in real time, synchronizing with the music as it is played. The feature is found in electronic music visualizers and media player software.

Visualization techniques range from simple ones (e.g., a simulation of an oscilloscope display) to elaborate ones, which often include a number of composited effects. The changes in the music's loudness and frequency spectrum are among the properties used as input to the visualization.

Effective music visualization aims to attain a high degree of visual correlation between a musical track's spectral characteristics such as frequency and amplitude and the objects or components of the visual image being rendered and displayed.

In modern usage, a basic music video that does not feature synthetic imagery, but nevertheless does not present a defined narrative (although it may comprise footage of real people or events), may also be termed a "visualizer".

== Definition ==
Midis2jam2 uses 3D models of music instruments to visualize MIDI playback.

Music visualization can be defined, in contrast to previous existing pre-generated music plus visualization combinations (as for example music videos), by its characteristic as being real-time generated. Another possible distinction is seen by some in the ability of some music visualization systems (such as Geiss' MilkDrop) to create different visualizations for each song or audio every time the program is run, in contrast to other forms of music visualization (such as music videos or a laser lighting display) which always show the same visualization. Music visualization may be achieved in a 2D or a 3D coordinate system where up to six dimensions can be modified, the 4th, 5th and 6th dimensions being color, intensity and transparency.

== History ==
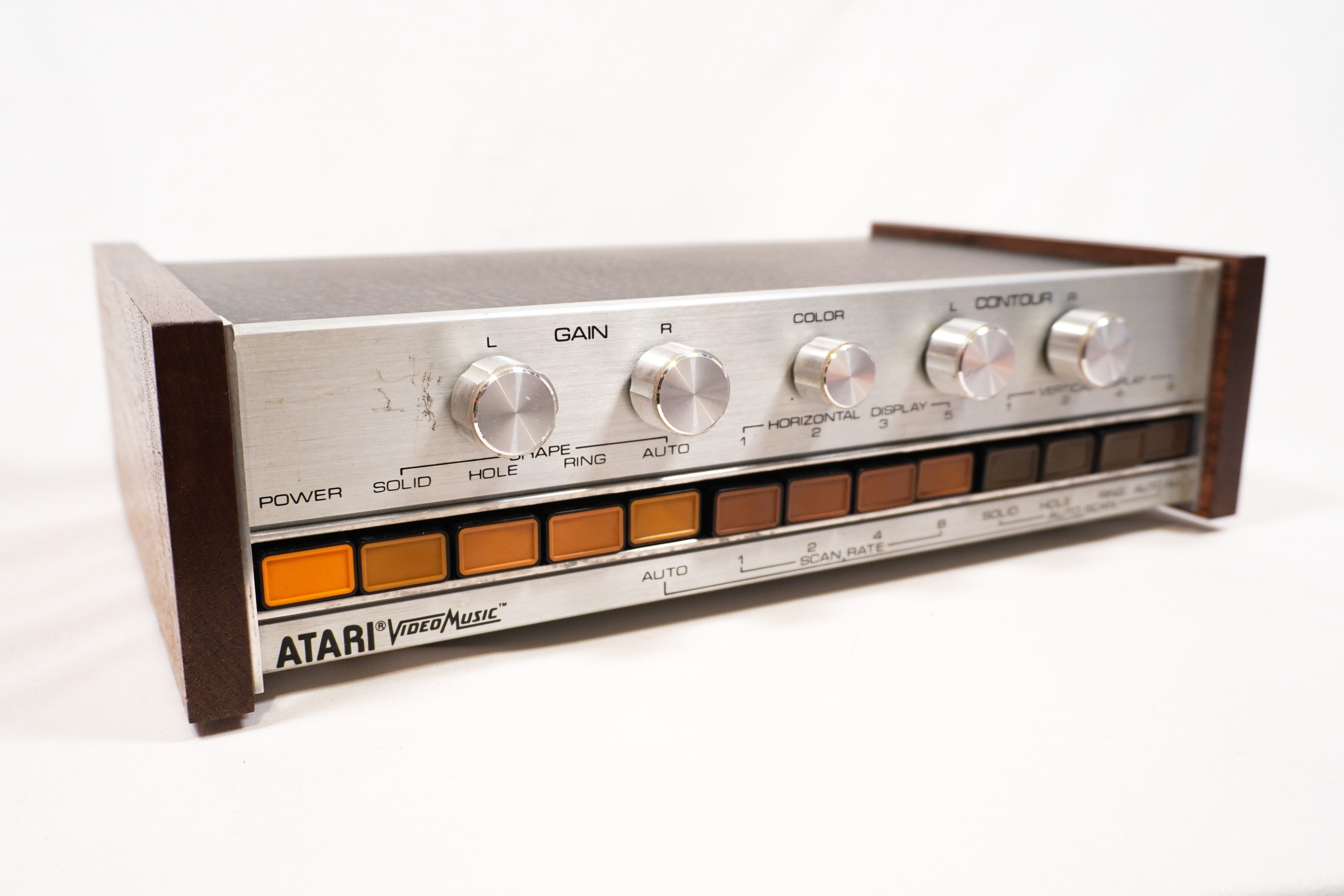
The Atari Video Music, available in 1976. The unit never gained enough popularity and was in production for only a year.

The first electronic music visualizer was the Atari Video Music introduced by Atari Inc. in 1977, and designed by the initiator of the home version of Pong, Robert Brown. The idea was to create a visual exploration that could be implemented into a Hi-Fi stereo system. In the United Kingdom music visualization was first pioneered by Fred Judd.

Music and audio players were available on early home computers, with some possessing visualization features, such as Sound to Light Generator (1985, Infinite Software), which used the ZX Spectrum's cassette player. The 1984 movie Electric Dreams prominently made use of a music visualizer, although as a pre-generated effect, rather than calculated in real-time.

For IBM PC compatibles, one of the first music visualization programs was the open-source, multi-platform Cthugha, written in 1993. In the 1990s, the tracker music scene, which originated on the Amiga, used real-time techniques for music visualization with programs such as Cubic Player (1994), Inertia Player (1995), as well as elaborate audio/visual experiences from the demoscene.

Computer music visualization became widespread in the mid to late 1990s as applications such as Winamp (1997), Audion (1999), and SoundJam (2000). By 1999, there were several dozen freeware music visualizers in distribution. In particular, Geiss for Winamp (1998) and MilkDrop (2001) by Ryan Geiss, G-Force by Andy O'Meara, and AVS (2000) by Nullsoft became popular music visualizations. AVS is part of Winamp and has been recently open-sourced, and G-Force was licensed for use in iTunes and Windows Media Center and is presently the flagship product for Andy O'Meara's software startup company, SoundSpectrum. In 2008, iTunes added the "Magnetosphere" visualizer created by The Barbarian Group.

== Use by the deaf community ==
There have been applications of electronic music visualization in order to enhance the music listening experience for deaf and hard of hearing people. Richard Burn, a PhD candidate at Birmingham City University, as of 2015, is researching a device that displays detailed visual feedback from electronic instruments. These visuals will provide information on the specifics of what is being played, such as the pitch and the harmonics of the sound. This allows deaf musicians to better understand what notes they are playing, which enables them to create music in a new way.

Researchers from the National University of Singapore have also created a device that seeks to enhance musical experiences for deaf people. This technology combines a music display and haptic chair that integrates sound qualities from music into vibrations and visual images that correlate with the specific qualities found within the music. The visual display shows various shapes that change size, color, and brightness in correlation with the music. Combining this visual display with a haptic chair that vibrates along with the music aims to give a more all-around experience of music to those hard of hearing.

Music visualization can also be used in education of deaf students. The Cooper Union in New York City is using music visualization to teach deaf children about sound. They have developed an interactive light studio in the American Sign Language and English Lower School in New York City. This consists of an interactive wall display that shows digital output created by sound and music. Children can trigger the playing of instruments with their movement, and they can watch the visual feedback from this music. They are also able to view a "talking flower" wall, in which each flower can transform sound into light based on the specific frequencies of the sounds.

== List of electronic music visualizers ==
- Atari Video Music, designed by the initiator of the home version of Pong, Robert Brown, and introduced by Atari Inc. in 1976.
- The original PlayStation (console) had a 'soundscope' functionality as a music visualizer.

== List of music visualization software ==
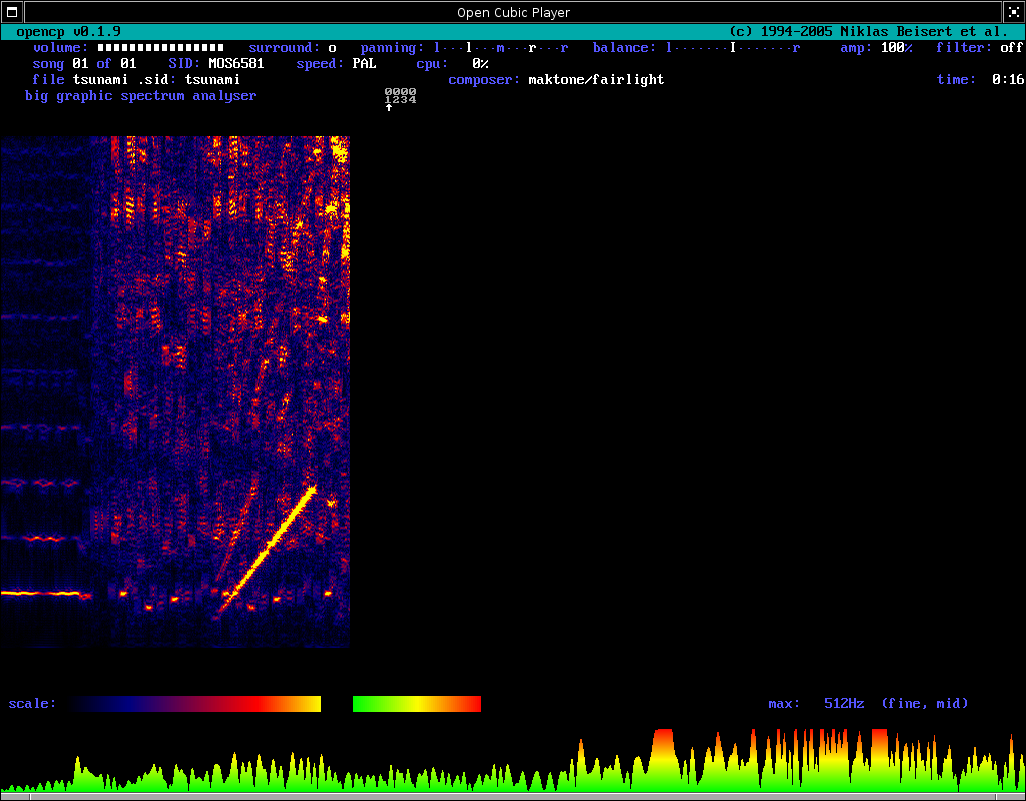
OpenCubic Player, MS-DOS module file player with real-time STFT based music visualization from 1994

- Advanced Visualization Studio (Justin Frankel) Windows
- Cthugha (1993, Kevin "Zaph" Burfitt) MS-DOS, Winamp
- Magic Music Visuals (2012–present, Color & Music, LLC) Windows, Mac
- MilkDrop (2001–2022, Ryan Geiss) reimplemented as projectM, multi-platform
- Music Animation Machine (1985–2013, Stephen Malinowski) visualizes MIDI, rather than waveforms.

Jeff Minter has a long history of creating music visualizers, which he calls "light synthesizers", including:

- Psychedelia (1984), intended to create visualizations to accompany music, but does not take audio as input
- Trip-a-Tron (1988) Atari ST, Amiga
- Virtual Light Machine (1990), later used in the Jaguar CD and Nuon
- Neon (2004, with Ivan Zorzin) Xbox 360

== List of media players supporting visualization ==
- AIMP (AIMP DevTeam) (Platform: Windows)
- Foobar2000 (Platform: Windows)
- MediaPortal (OpenSource, Team MediaPortal) (Platform: Windows)
- iTunes (2001, Apple) (Platforms: Mac OS X, Windows)
- Apple Music (2019, Apple) (Platforms: macOS, iOS & Android)
- Elmedia Player (Eltima Software) (Platform: Mac OS)
- Winamp (Nullsoft/Radionomy) (Platform: Windows)
- Macamp Mac
- Windows Media Player (Microsoft) (Platform: Windows)
- MediaMonkey (Ventis Media Inc.) (Platform: Windows)
- RealPlayer (RealNetworks) (Platform: Windows)
- Kodi (formerly XBMC) (Team XBMC) (Platform: Cross-Platform)
- MusicBee (Steven Mayall) (Platforms: Windows)
- KMPlayer (Pandora.TV) (Platform: Windows)
- Amarok (Open Source, KDE) (Platform: Cross-platform)
- Totem (Open Source, Gnome) (Platform: Linux)
- Clementine (Open Source) (Platform: Cross-platform)
- Audacious Media Player (Audacious Team) (Platform: POSIX)
- VLC media player (Open Source, VideoLAN Project) (Platform: Cross-platform)
- Xine player

== See also ==
- Animusic
- Video synthesizer
- Augmented reality § Music
- Clavier à lumières
- Cymatics
- Liquid light show
- List of music software
- Synthesia
- Video art
- VJing
