= Cockos =

American digital audio technology company

Cockos, Inc.
- Type: Public
- Industry: Software
- Founded: 2004
- Founder: Justin Frankel
- Headquarters: San Francisco, California
- Area served: Worldwide
- Key people: Justin Frankel, Christophe Thibault, John Schwartz, Jean-François Bédague
- Products: REAPER, NINJAM, Jesusonic
- Website: Cockos

Cockos, Inc is an American digital audio technology company founded in 2004, most notable for their digital audio workstation software REAPER.

== History ==
Cockos was founded in 2004 by Justin Frankel after his departure from Nullsoft. The company name stems from mis-hearing a quote from the movie Office Space. While the company also develops small software tools often released under an open source license its main focus is on music software. They released their first music software product, a programmable effects processor called Jesusonic, on December 21, 2004. Following up in 2005, they released the online music jam software NINJAM under the GPL, with the release of their flagship product REAPER following later that year.

== Staff ==
Cockos currently has two programmers: Justin Frankel, the company founder, probably best known for his work on the Winamp media player application, and John Schwartz, who joined Cockos in 2008 and is the author of several audio plug-ins, notably a virtual analogue synthesizer called Olga. Christophe Thibault, an old colleague of Frankel's from his Nullsoft days, was a Cockos employee between 2005 and 2014. Thibault is a French programmer and was the founder of the Kaillera and K-Meleon projects. In April 2014 he moved to Blizzard Entertainment.
