= Ultravox (software) =

Ultravox or Ultravox Media On Demand Server (UltraMODS) is a streaming video project by AOL. The goal of the project is to create a service for routers akin to SHOUTcast, aiming to help the data be handled better, to allow for more efficient handling of more users, and to enable much faster channel changing.

== Marketing ==
Certain streams made available by Shoutcast use Ultravox. AOL Radio has since moved to a non-streaming "beamcast" approach to music listening as of late Summer 2008. CBS Radio stations featured on AOL Radio use a variety of streaming methods not limited to Ultravox.

== Technology ==
This format uses uvox URLs, and can be viewed in Winamp. Nullsoft is reportedly helping AOL create Ultravox. Nullsoft also released Nullsoft Streaming Video, which is streamed through Ultravox software.

Michael Wise is on the ISMA Board of Directors, and is reported as being actively involved in AOL’s streaming technology planning. In an effort to drive interoperability and lower distribution costs, he and his team are now working to standardize key parts of Ultravox, AOL’s own streaming technology platform.

Ultravox is implemented in servers and in the firmware of certain routers to provide efficient, scalable delivery to hundreds of thousands of customers simultaneously.

== See also ==
- AOL Radio
