= Tom Pepper =

American computer programmer (born 1975)

- Born: August 24, 1975 (age 49); Des Moines, Iowa

Tom Pepper (born August 24, 1975, in Des Moines, Iowa) is a computer programmer best known for his collaboration with Justin Frankel on the Gnutella peer-to-peer system. He and Frankel co-founded Nullsoft, whose most popular program is Winamp, which was sold to AOL in May 1999. He subsequently worked for AOL developing SHOUTcast, an Internet streaming audio service, with Frankel and Stephen "Tag" Loomis. After leaving AOL in 2004. he worked at RAZZ, Inc. He continues to collaborate with Frankel on independent projects like Ninjam.

== See also ==
- WASTE
- Friend-to-friend (F2F)
- File sharing
- Peer-to-peer (P2P)
- Gnutella
- Nullsoft
- Justin Frankel
