= Advanced Visualization Studio =

Winamp music visualisation plugin

- Developer: Nullsoft
- Release: March 3, 2000; 26 years ago
- Stable release: 2.93
- Written in: C / C++
- Operating system: Windows
- Available in: English
- Type: Music visualization
- License: BSD license
- Website: www.nullsoft.com/free/avs

Advanced Visualization Studio (AVS), is a music visualization plugin for Winamp. It was designed by Winamp creator, Justin Frankel and was first shipped in version 2.0a4 with Winamp 2.61. AVS has a customizable design which allows users to create their own visualization effects, or "presets". AVS was made open source software in May 2005, released under a BSD-style license. AVS is currently at version 2.83 and is included with Winamp, though the distributed version has later been reverted due to compatibility issues. Winamp currently ships with version 2.82 for Windows Vista (and later) and 2.81d for older Windows versions.

== History ==
=== Initial releases ===
The first versions of AVS came with a set of pre-defined effects that could be arranged in any combination. Later versions introduced codeable components, most notably the "SuperScope" render effect and "Dynamic Movement". The AVS plugin-in can be extended itself with AVS Plugin Effects (APE).

Version 2.81b of AVS was released by Nullsoft in 2003. It was faster and added several new features like arrays and interactivity in visualizations. 2.82 is the current stable release after some minor updates by Darren "DrO" Owen. For a short period, version 2.83 was distributed, a decision that was eventually reversed due to incompatibilities.

=== Open-source and third-party versions ===
On May 18, 2005, it was announced that AVS would now be open source software, released under a BSD-style license.

Long after having left the company, Nullsoft founder Justin Frankel released a fork in August 2010 of the plug-in, titled "Cockos Happy AVS". It was first released as version 2.9, continuing the version scheme where the official version left off.

As of October 2013, AVS presets can be played directly in the browser using the Webvs visualizer. However, only a small subset of effects is supported at this point.

=== Acquisition by Radionomy ===
With the release of Winamp version 5.66 on November 20, 2013, AOL announced that Winamp.com would shut down on December 20, 2013, and Winamp and its components would cease to be offered for download after that date. Resulting in the shutdown, many AVS downloads will be lost. The AVS Archive is an attempt to preserve some of the more popular AVS packs. The following day, an unofficial report surfaced that Microsoft was in talks with AOL to acquire Nullsoft. Despite AOL's announcement, the Winamp site was not shut down as planned, and on January 14, 2014, AOL sold Nullsoft to Belgian online radio aggregator Radionomy; no financial details were publicly announced. In fear of a shutdown, a mirror of the Winamp-hosted AVS forums has been published on GitHub.

== Making presets ==
Every preset is made up of different components. There are three categories of components: Render, Trans and Misc. Render draws shapes, Trans transforms the current image and Misc contains the components that don't fit in other two categories. The components are plugged into a list, which is executed from top to bottom, each component doing something with the image and sending the result to the next one. A lot of components are configurable and a few are codable. Effect lists can be included, which act as presets within presets.

=== Codeable components ===
The codable components allow the most customizability, when a preset author can control and program effects through AVS' simple scripting language. The scripting language is compiled to native code at runtime for maximum performance.

The following components can be scripted:

- Superscope
- Triangles
- Texer II
- Movement
- Dynamic Movement
- Dynamic Distance Modifier
- Dynamic Shift
- Bump
- Effect List
- Global Variable Manager

User-generated presets may be featured on websites such as Winamp.com, DeviantArt or customize.org.
