= Cthugha (software) =

Music visualization computer program

Cthugha is a music visualization computer program. It was written in the mid-1990s by Kevin "Zaph" Burfitt for MS-DOS, and later ported to other platforms. It was freely distributed.

Blue fire

Metallic Lightning

Solar Flare

Oil Shimmer

== History ==
Cthugha was started by Australian coder Kevin "Zaph" Burfitt in September 1993 as an MS-DOS program, but not released to the public until version 2.0 in March 1994. The program gained popularity with release 5.1p in October 1994.

Cthugha was released for Linux ("Cthugha-L") in May 1995, and for the Macintosh ("MaCthugha") in January 1996

Cthugha was used as the video wall background for the Australian children's TV game show Challenger, hosted by Zoe Sheridan during the late 90s.

Burfitt stopped work on Cthugha in January 2001, and there were various attempts by others to carry on the project, but by that time there were so many clones of the software that there was little enthusiasm. Cthugha may have been the forerunner – either in inspiration, or possibly even as source-code – of the numerous and varied "visualisation" plugins for mp3 players and media players on many computer architectures.

In 1998, it was ported to the Winamp music player.

== Usage ==
Cthugha uses a sound card's CD, line or microphone input.

== Reaction ==
The oscilloscope patterns of Cthugha have been described as "weird" and "hypnotic".

== See also ==
- Cthugha - The mythical demon the software was named after.
- Sonoluma - a modern clone of Cthugha available for MacOS and Windows
