= QSF =

QSF may refer to:

- Quebec Soccer Federation
- Qalamoun Shield Forces, a Syrian militia
- IATA code for Ain Arnat Airport, an airport in Algeria
- Unofficial code for airports in the San Francisco Metropolitan Area, used in some ticketing systems but not approved by IATA
- An uncompressed variant of the Portable Sound Format
- Extension and file format for data files exported by Qualtrics online survey software
