= Rogue Amoeba =

Audio software company

Rogue Amoeba Software, Inc.
- Company type: Inc.
- Industry: Computer software
- Founded: 2002
- Headquarters: Boston, MA, United States
- Key people: Quentin Carnicelli, CTO/Toolsmith; Paul Kafasis, CEO/Lackey; Alex Lagutin, Senior Programmer/Head of R&D
- Products: Airfoil; Audio Hijack; Audio Hijack Pro; Farrago; Fission; Nicecast; Pulsar; Radioshift; Loopback; Piezo; SoundSource
- Website: rogueamoeba.com

Rogue Amoeba Software, Inc. is a software company that produces audio software, specializing in applications for audio capture for the Macintosh platform. Rogue Amoeba's best-known product is Audio Hijack (formerly known as Audio Hijack Pro), which allows for users to capture and record audio from any program running under macOS. It also includes support for VST, Audio Unit, and LADSPA plugins, among other features.

Other software by Rogue Amoeba includes Airfoil, Fission, Loopback, Piezo, SoundSource, Farrago, and the now-discontinued Nicecast. Airfoil allows for the transmission of any audio through the remote speaker system of Apple's AirPort Express, which currently only supports audio from iTunes. Fission is an audio file editor designed to be simple and user-friendly. It has basic operations like fading and splitting, and can edit MP3 files without losing quality to recompression. Nicecast combined Audio Hijack's ability to capture audio with the open source Icecast streaming media system to enable users to broadcast audio from any program over the internet, before being discontinued in 2018.

Their programs have won numerous awards, including "Best of Show" at the 2004 San Francisco Macworld Conference & Expo, two O'Reilly Mac OS X Innovators Awards, and two Macworld "Eddy" awards.

== History ==
Rogue Amoeba began in 1998 when Alex Lagutin and Paul Kafasis began working together, first on the release of a small shareware add-on to the MacAMP MP3 player, and then at @soft Software, developers of MacAMP itself.

Along with Dmitry Boldyrev, creator of MacAMP, Lagutin and Kafasis left @soft to form Subband Software. They were later joined by Quentin Carnicelli, author of his own MP3 player. Subband went on to reacquire the MacAMP name, and released an MP3 player, again named MacAMP. While at Subband, Lagutin originated the idea for a MacAMP plugin that would capture audio from other applications. Audio Hijack was born as a plugin for MacAMP for Mac OS 9.

A version of Audio Hijack as a standalone application for Mac OS X was created in 2002 and went on sale September 30, 2002. Rogue Amoeba Software, LLC was officially registered December 31, 2002 by Lagutin, Carnicelli, and Kafasis.
