= Comparison of remote music performance software =

Software created specifically to minimise or eliminate issues with Internet-related audio latency enables musicians to perform live music together over domestic broadband connections. The use of various compression and other techniques, together with affordable low-latency audio interface hardware (which most of the systems listed here are also optimised to work with), has reached a state in which it is practical for even large numbers of musicians to play or sing together without experiencing significant problems.

One of the problems with music playing over the Internet in real time is latency - the time lag that occurs while audio streams travel to and from each musician. Although the precedence effect means that small delays (up to around 40 ms) can be perceived as synchronous, longer delays make it practically impossible to play live together. A further problem is jitter, a type of packet delay due to changes in latency over time, which results in choppy or distorted sound. Long delays can even lead to packet loss (perceived as a 'blackouts'). These can be alleviated by delay buffers or jitter buffers, but these then add to the overall round-trip delay, so need to be balanced.

Total latency is composed of:

- Network latency due to delays within the network - every 300km is responsible for at least 1 ms extra latency since the speed of light limits the data transport on internet.
- Conversion latency - if analog-to-digital conversion or digital-to-analog conversion is not handled by special hardware, these conversions will add additional latency;
- Audio latency from sound traveling through air, if the microphone and/or loudspeakers are not in immediate proximity. Every meter of distance adds around 3ms delay due to the limitation of the speed of sound.

Popular video conferencing software such as Zoom or Teams is unsuited to this task as the latency is too high. Zoom recommends "a latency of 150ms or less" and jitter of "40ms or less", and in some 2020 tests was shown to have an average latency of 135 ms. The "Audio poor quality metrics" for Teams include having "Round-trip time >500 ms" and "Jitter >30 ms". In addition, most such software is optimized for speech rather than music, so sustained musical notes can be misidentified as background noise and filtered out (although this can be alleviated to an extent via settings such as "Enable Original Sound"). Conferencing software is also often designed for one person to be heard at a time (the speaker gets 'focus'), to stop people talking over each other, but this makes playing music together impossible. In addition, it does not normally allow detailed setting of individual audio streams' volume or panning on the user side.

The following table compares key features of software written for the expressed purpose of allowing musicians to perform music together over the Internet. It does not attempt to cover subjective features such as sound quality or ease of use. However, some software on the list may address different aspects of remote collaboration better than others, or may be more suited to certain musical genres.

Name	Licence	Charge	Architecture	Platforms	Session type ^{[a]}	Max. participants	Synch. ^{[b]}	Video	Codec	Sample rate	Bitrate	First release	Current release	Date
Bonza Music	Proprietary	Free to join sessions, Free trial, subscription	P2P	Mac, Win	Closed	No fixed maximum	None	Yes	Opus & Uncompressed	48 kHZ, 96 kHz, 192 kHz	24-192 kbit/s (Opus); 768 kbit/s (Linear)	March 2026	3.0	2026-11-13
Koord	GPL	Freemium	Client/Server	Win, Mac, Linux, iOS, Android	Closed	Up to 75	None	Yes	Opus	48 kHz	132-894 kbit/s	2021	1.4.47	2023-01-28
Jamstud.io	Proprietary	Free	P2P	Win, Mac, Linux	Open & Closed	6	None	Yes	Uncompressed	44.1 kHz	16-bit	April 2021	1.24	2021-11-9
Sublive	Proprietary	Free/donationware	P2P	Win, Mac	Open & Closed	5	Audio track	Yes	Opus	48 kHz	32-384 kbit/s	May 2021	0.42	2021-09-21
Groovesetter	Proprietary	Free plan or Free Trial	P2P	Win, Mac	Closed	8 Locations	Mixed	No	Uncompressed	From 44.1 kHz to 192 kHz	16-bit, 24-bit, 32-bit	May 2021	1.2.13	2021-08-08
Jam Connect	Proprietary	Freemium	P2P	Win, Mac, iOS, Android	Open & Closed	Up to 16 locations	Tracks possible	Yes	Opus & Uncompressed	48 kHz	At least 16-bit	2021	2.5	2021-10-01
Jamulus	GPL	Free	Client/Server	Win, Mac, Linux, Android	Open & Closed	100+	None	No	Opus	48 kHz	132-894 kbit/s	2006	3.11.0	2024-09-21
JammerNetz	AGPL and MIT available	Free	Client/Server	Win, Mac, Linux	Closed	?	None	No	Uncompressed	48 kHz	dep. on # channels	2019	2.0.0	2021-03-21
Digital Stage	Proprietary	Free, restricted	Various	Win, Mac, Linux	Closed	30							Prototype testing	
Sagora	GPL	Free	Client/Server	Win, Mac, Linux, Raspbian	Open & Closed		None		Opus	48 kHz		May 2020	1.1	2020-08
LoLa	Proprietary	Free/shareware	P2P	Win	Closed	3 locations	None	Yes			at least 1 Gbit/s	2005	2.0.0b1	2019-10-18
JamKazam	Proprietary	$0 - $19.99p/m	P2P, C/S	Win, Mac	Open & Closed	Unlimited (for $10+ plans)	Metronome	Yes (paid plans)		48 kHz; 44.1 kHz		2014 (?)	1.0.3950	?
SoundJack	Proprietary	Free	P2P, C/S	Win, Mac, Linux	Open & Closed	~60	None	β (OSX)	Opus & Uncompressed	48 kHz		2006	monthly updates	2022-03-26
JackTrip	MIT like	Free	P2P, C/S	CLI: Win, Mac, Linux	?	Unlimited	None	No				2000 (?)	1.3.0	2020-08-04
SonoBus	GPL	Free	P2P via AoO	Win, Mac, Linux, iOS, Android	Open & Closed	10	None	No	Opus & Uncompressed	48 kHz & 44.1 kHz		2020-08-31	1.7.2	2023-12-11
HPS Jam	BSD	Free	Client/Server	Win, Mac, Linux, iOS, Android	Open & Closed	256	None	No	8/16/24/32-bit PCM and MIDI	48 kHz		2020-11-19	v1.2.5	2022-10-12
Ninjam / Ninbot	GPL (Server only)	$60	Client/Server	Win, Mac, Linux	?	?	Delayed Sync	No				?	REAPER 6.18	?
Jamtaba	GPL	Free	Ninjam Client	Win, Mac, Linux	?	?	Delayed Sync	Yes				2015-09-26	v2.1.15	2020-06-30
Jammr.net	GPL	Free - $9.99p/m	Client/Server	Win, Mac, Linux	Open & Closed	20	Delayed Sync	No				?	1.2.92	2020-09-13
Endless	Proprietary	Free - $4.49	?	iOS	Open & Closed	?	Metronome	No				?	1.1.2	2020-11-13
Ejamming Audio	Proprietary	$9.95p/m	P2P(?)	Win, Mac	Closed	4	?	No				?	?	?
Rehearsal Live Share	Proprietary	$14.99p/m (directors)	Client/Server	Win, Mac, iOS, Android	Closed	30	Audio track	Yes	?	?	?	?	?	?
Solocontutti	Proprietary	Free to join sessions Basic and Pro subscriptions to start sessions	P2P	Win, Mac, iOS, Android	Open & Closed	12	Metronome	Yes (limited)	Opus	44.1 kHz - 48 kHz	100 - 500 kbit/s	2013	3.1.14	2026-03-26
FarPlay	Proprietary	Freemium	P2P	Win, Mac, Linux	Closed	About 8		Yes	Uncompressed	48 kHz	768 kbit/s per audio channel	2021-11-18	1.2.7	2024-05-08
Elk Live	OS is open source	$15.99p/m + $399 bridge	P2P	Elk Audio OS	Closed	5 for now		Yes						
Ringing Room	Proprietary	Free	Client/Server	Win, Mac, iOS	Open	16	No	No					21.51	
Lutefish	Proprietary	$400 hardware $13p/m or $20p/m				5/50		Yes		48 kHz		Summer 2024		2024-02-13
ovbox	GPL	Free	P2P/CS	Linux, Mac	Closed	Unlimited / up to 10 on Raspberry Pi 4B	Metronome	Yes (limited)	Uncompressed	up to 192 kHz		2020	0.21.1	2024-02-19

== Table Heading Notes ==
[a] - Whether the system supports public or private performance or playing.
[b] - Whether the system has a built-in mechanism for helping or enforcing the musicians to play together. For an explanation of "delayed sync" method see https://jammr.net/howitworks.html (or, more in depth, https://forum.cockos.com/showthread.php?p=2230659#post2230659)

== See also ==
- Networked music performance
