= Jamulus =

Live music collaboration software

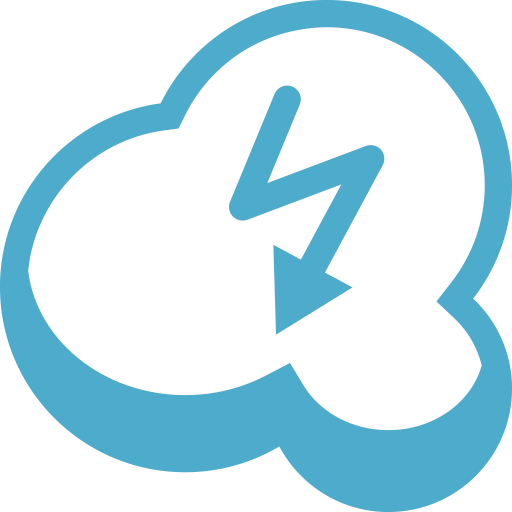
- Developers: Volker Fischer and contributors
- Release: 2006; 20 years ago
- Stable release: 3.12.5 / August 31, 2026; 3 days ago
- Written in: C++
- Operating system: Windows (ASIO / JACK); macOS; Linux (Jack); Android; iOS
- License: GPLv2
- Website: jamulus.app
- Repository: github.com/jamulussoftware/jamulus

Jamulus is open source (GPL) networked music performance software that enables live rehearsing, jamming and performing with musicians located anywhere on the internet. Jamulus is written by Volker Fischer and contributors using C++. The Software is based on the Qt framework and uses the OPUS audio codec. It was known as "llcon" until 2013.

Jamulus is client-server based; each client transmits its own compressed audio to a server on the internet. The server mixes the (decompressed) audio stream for each user separately and re-transmits the individual compressed mix to each client. Each client has its own mixing console which controls its mix on the server.

Servers can be either public or private (termed "Registered" and "Unregistered", since Jamulus has no built-in user authentication mechanism), the former being listed by "directories" from which users can choose a server with the lowest latency for them.

== Usage ==
Already in 2018, Jamulus was attracting attention as a way for classical ensembles such as string quartets to rehearse at a distance, but its usage increased dramatically in 2020 due to the COVID-19 pandemic. In April 2020 it was being downloaded two thousand times per day, with the trend increasing. It was elected SourceForge 'Project of the Month' in June 2020. Jamulus Storband, Sweden's first "virtual big band" with over 20 members, also started that month. Many changes were later made to support larger groups, such as choirs with as many as 98 members as well as WorldJam, an initiative allowing musicians from all over the world to play together on a regular basis.

Having a synchronized metronome for participants of a session can be key to helping musicians keep the pace of the song and be in sync with each other. Numerous online metronomes are available, or other OpenSource tools may be used: as one example, Sychronome uses NTP (Network Time Protocol) with a network time server to sync metronomes for each Jamulus client via smartphones.

== See also ==
- LoLa
- JamKazam
- Ninjam / Ninbot
- SonoBus
- HPSJam
- Koord
- Comparison of remote music performance software
