= Collective creativity =

Ability to generate new ideas and solutions together in a creative process

In the behavioral sciences, collective creativity, in analogy to collective intelligence, is the shared human ability to generate new ideas and solutions together in a creative process. It occurs when social interactions lead to new interpretations and discoveries which individual thinking could not have generated.

In a business context, enterprises try to tap the combined creativity of their employees and how this creativity can be managed and tapped so as to create innovation.

When many of us think about innovation ...we think about an Einstein having an 'Aha!' moment. But we all know that's a myth. Innovation is not about solo genius, it's about collective genius

— Linda Hill

A more natural fostering environment for collective creativity, however, can be found in the sciences, arts and literature where a certain degree of unmanaged self-organization can take place. Musical collective improvisation is an outstanding exemplification of artistic collective on-the-spot creation. Academic conferences can be breeding grounds for (spontaneous) development of new scientific ideas.

Several components have been identified as the basis of collective creativity, with diversity (in perspectives, cultures, etc.) from and thus even controversial ideas among the contributing individuals being one of the most prominent ones.

A similar concept can be found in distributed creativity that emphasizes the potential "scatteredness" of the contributing individuals.

Social collaboration as a collective creative processes has been found to thrive on the "edge of chaos".

== See also ==
- Innovation management – Systematic planning, management and control of innovation in organizations
- Co-creation – Product or service design process
- Computational creativity – Multidisciplinary endeavour
- Solidarity – Unity of feeling or action on a common interest

== Bibliography ==
- Yu, Lixiu; Nickerson, Jeffrey V.; Sakamoto, Yasuaki (2012-04-17). "Collective Creativity: Where we are and where we might go". arXiv:1204.3890 [cs.SI]. "Creativity is individual, and it is social. The social aspects of creativity have become of increasing interest as systems have emerged that mobilize large numbers of people to engage in creative tasks. We examine research related to collective intelligence and differentiate work on collective creativity from other collective activities by analyzing systems with respect to the tasks that are performed and the outputs that result. Three types of systems are discussed: games, contests and networks. We conclude by suggesting how systems that generate collective creativity can be improved and how new systems might be constructed."
- Gerhard Fischer; Florian Vassen, eds. (2011). Collective creativity: collaborative work in the sciences, literature and the arts. Amsterdam New York: Rodopi. ISBN 978-90-420-3274-3. "... in opposition to the traditional ideal of the individual as creative genius, cultural theorists today emphasize the collaborative nature of creativity; they show that 'creativity makes alterity, discontinuity and difference attractive'"
- Cirella, Stefano (December 2021). "Managing collective creativity: Organizational variables to support creative teamwork". European Management Review. 18 (4): 404–417. doi:10.1111/emre.12475. hdl:11572/376714. "The findings indicate that five distinct variables may support teams and groups in developing their (collective) creativity: a structured process, work-related team diversity, boundary openness, adequate resources, and support of relevant technology."
- Acar, Oguz A.; Tuncdogan, Aybars; van Knippenberg, Daan; Lakhani, Karim R. (July 2024). "Collective Creativity and Innovation: An Interdisciplinary Review, Integration, and Research Agenda". Journal of Management. 50 (6): 2119–2151. doi:10.1177/01492063231212416.
- Linda Hill (2014). "How to manage for collective creativity". TED talks.
- Tomas Backström; Tobias Söderberg (2016). "Self-Organisation and Group Creativity" (PDF). Journal of Creativity and Business Innovation. 2.
- Educator, Teach (2025-09-04). "What is Collective Creativity? & Characteristics of Professional Communities". Teach Educator.
- Laroche, Julien; Bachrach, Asaf; Noy, Lior (6 November 2024). "De-sync: disruption of synchronization as a key factor in individual and collective creative processes". BMC Neuroscience. 25 (1) 67. doi:10.1186/s12868-024-00874-z. PMC 11539736. PMID 39506636.
- Pick, Hadas; Fahoum, Nardine; Shamay Tsoory, Simone G. (January 2025). "Creating together: An interbrain model of group creativity". Neuropsychologia. 207 109063. doi:10.1016/j.neuropsychologia.2024.109063. PMID 39653071.
