= Qmmp =

Open source audio player

qmmp

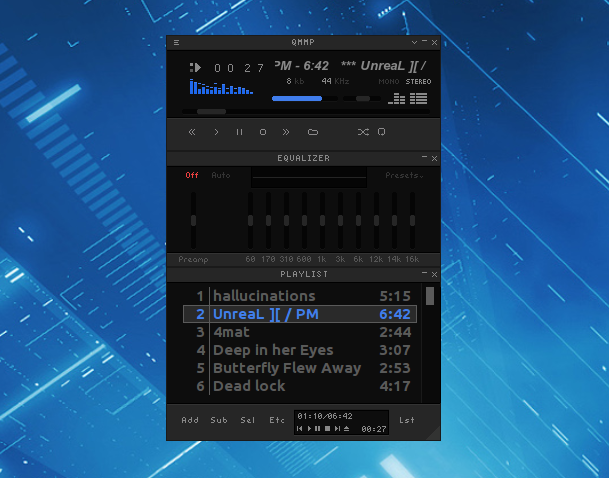
- qmmp using the default skin (Glare)
- Developer: qmmp Development Team
- Initial release: March 21, 2007; 19 years ago
- Written in: C++
- Operating system: Cross-platform: Linux, FreeBSD, Windows
- Platform: Qt
- Available in: English, Ukrainian, Russian, Polish, Japanese, Hebrew, Czech, Lithuanian, German, Dutch, Hungarian
- Type: Audio player
- License: GPL-2.0-or-later
- Website: qmmp.ylsoftware.com
- Repository: svn.code.sf.net/p/qmmp-dev/code/

qmmp (for Qt-based MultiMedia Player) is a free and open-source cross-platform audio player that is similar to Winamp. It is written in C++ using the Qt widget toolkit for the user interface. It officially supports the operating systems Linux, FreeBSD and Microsoft Windows. In most Linux distributions, it is available through the standard package repositories. Until Audacious switched to Qt in version 4.0, qmmp was the only audio player to use Qt and not feature a database.

== Features ==
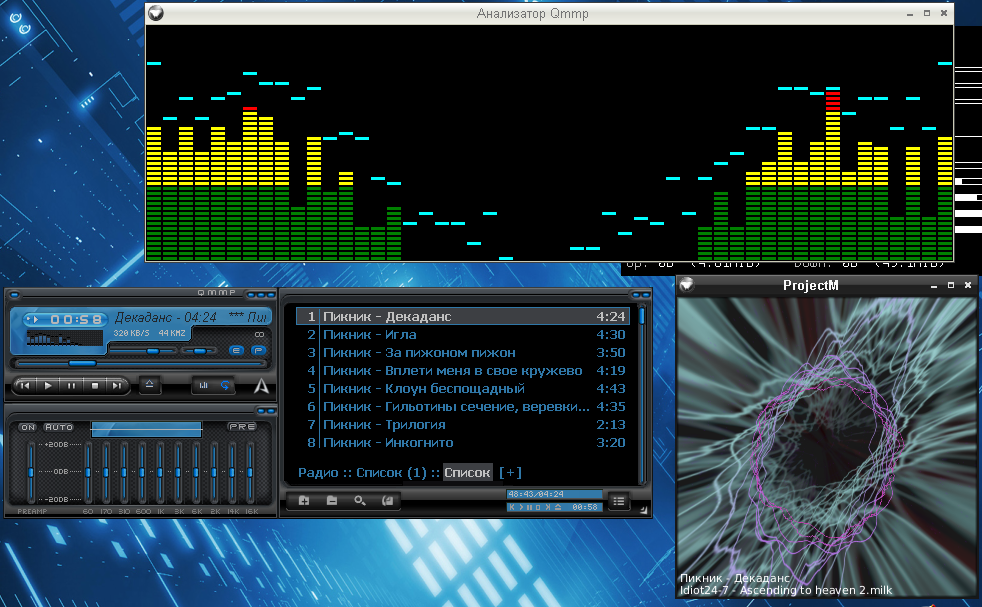
Qmmp (skinned)

Qmmp is known for its small, themeable user interface and low use of system resources. The user interface and behaviour is similar to Winamp, which was popular at the time. By supporting Winamp (Classic) skin files, the program can be configured to appear similar to Winamp 2.x. It also has support for cue sheets and volume normalization according to the ReplayGain standard. Album cover art is supported using separate sidecar files or embedded in ID3v2 tags and is automatically fetched if missing.

- A simple, intuitive user interface
- MP3, AAC, Ogg Vorbis, Ogg Opus, and FLAC music playback support
- Support for multiple artist and performer tags per song
- A notification area icon
- Plugin support
- Translations into many languages
- Equalizer
- Visualizations such as Goom and projectM.

== See also ==
- Comparison of free software for audio § Players
