= Radionomy =

Former web radio service

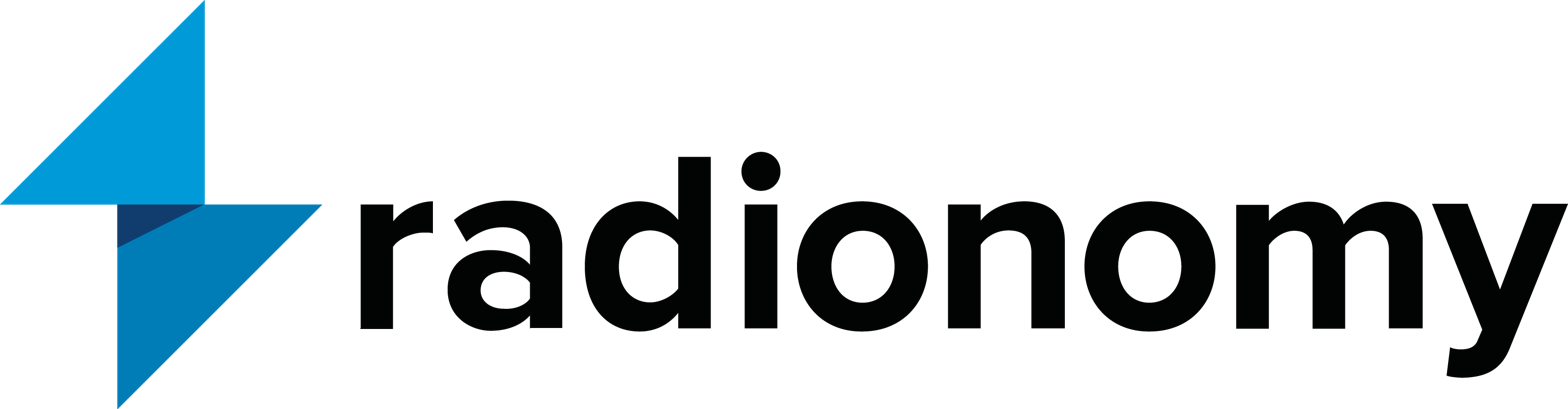
- Company type: Private
- Available in: French (primary); English
- Founded: January 2008 in Brussels, Belgium
- Headquarters: Brussels, Belgium
- Area served: Worldwide
- Owners: Targetspot (majority stake), Union Square Ventures (minority stake)
- Founders: Alexandre Saboundjian; Yves Baudechon; Gilles Bindels; Cedric van Kan
- Key people: Alexandre Saboundjian (Founder and CEO); Jef Mauguit (CTO); Thierry Ascarez (VP of Business Development)
- Services: Internet Radio
- Website: radionomy.com
- Advertising: Banner ads, Audio ads
- Registration: Free (required to save stations)
- Launched: April 2008
- Current status: Closed, January 2020

Radionomy was an online platform that provided tools for operating online radio stations. It was part of Radionomy Group, a company which later acquired the online streaming platform SHOUTcast from Nullsoft, and eventually consolidated Radionomy into its SHOUTcast service.

== Concept ==
Radionomy, a portmanteau of "radio" and "autonomy," is a platform that facilitates user-driven creation and consumption of online radio content. Through the Radionomy Musical Platform (RMO), users possess the autonomy to curate and program their online radio stations, incorporating elements such as music, commentary, and radio jingles. The platform empowers users to contribute original audio content, including musical compositions and jingles, and offers the capability for live broadcasts.

To ensure compliance with copyright regulations, Radionomy secures licensing from SABAM, enabling the legal use of music content. The platform sustains its operations and fulfills royalty obligations by incorporating advertising into broadcasts, limited to a maximum of four minutes per hour. This advertising model serves as a primary revenue source, supporting the platform's commitment to facilitating user-created online radio experiences while adhering to legal and financial considerations.

== History ==
Radionomy was founded in September 2007 by four Belgian entrepreneurs: Alexandre Saboundjian, Gilles Bindels, Cedric van Kan and Yves Baudechon.

=== 2008 ===
- 17 January – Radionomy held a press conference at the Eiffel Tower in Paris, and announced the public launch of the planned business April 17, 2008.
- Late February – the alpha version of the Radio Manager is broadcast from a community of beta testers selected based on their radio project. This is the beginning of the beta test.
- 17 April – the Radionomy site opens to the Belgian and French public, allowing visitors to listen to Internet radio stations created on the platform.
- 17 June – Radionomy has released its beta.

=== 2010 ===
- Unknown – after several beta waves, live function is incorporated into all web radios, whatever the creation date and the number of radio listeners.

=== 2011 ===
- February 15 – opening of the feature "Play the radio" allowing all producers radios can have a website pre-designed.
- March – the launch of the advertising Adionomy that allows advertisers to broadcast their advertising on the web radios targeting listeners.
- 30 May – Radionomy invests in Hotmixradio.

=== 2012 ===
- June 28 – Radionomy announces the signing of an agreement with the US digital advertising platform Targetspot.
- August 29 – Adionomy board was launched, new governance in the world of digital radio in France.
- 5 September – Radionomy announces the opening of its US headquarters in San Francisco.
- 18 September – Radionomy launched G2, the new version of the platform. This includes updates to the site radionomy.com, and the release of the Radio Manager Online online platform which replaced the older Radio Manager desktop application. Facebook, iPhone, and iPad applications were also released.
- late October – Alexander Saboundjian, CEO of Radionomy, became manager of Hotmixradio, instead of its founder Olivier Riou.

=== 2013 ===
- 18 September – Radionomy won the award "International Excellence in Online Audio" awarded at the RAIN Summit in Orlando, Florida.
- December 16 – Radionomy acquired U.S.-based advertising Targetspot.

=== 2014 ===
Previous logo from 2015 to 2017.

- 17 January – Radionomy formalizes the acquisition of Winamp and SHOUTcast from AOL. However, TechCrunch has reported that the sale of Winamp and Shoutcast is worth between $5 and $10 million, with AOL taking a 12% stake (a financial, not strategic, investment) in Radionomy in the process.

=== 2015 ===
On 17 December 2015, Vivendi acquired a 64.4% majority stake in Radionomy. Its shareholders including its employees and a U.S based investment company Union Square Ventures, retained its stake in the company.

=== 2016 ===
- 26 February – In a lawsuit filed at a California federal court, a group of Sony brands – including Arista Records, LaFace Records and Sony Music Entertainment – accused Radionomy of copyright infringement. The case was settled out of court shortly thereafter.

=== 2017 ===
- AudioValley acquired a majority stake in Radionomy.

"In August 2017, AudioValley acquired the 64.4% stake held by Vivendi in Radionomy Group BV. AudioValley now owns 98.53% of the company's capital."

=== 2020 ===
- On 1 January, Radionomy shut down its streaming service and migrated towards the Shoutcast platform. This move was part of the group's wish to offer all digital radio producers new professional-quality tools to better meet their needs.

=== 2022 ===
- 5 July – AudioValley renames itself to Targetspot, with its focus shifting to its digital audio monetisation business.
- 22 November - Azerion Group N.V. acquires Radionomy Group B.V. and all of its subsidiaries (Targetspot and Shoutcast) from Targetspot SA.

=== 2023 ===
- February - Targetspot SA rebrands to Llama Group, based on its remaining Winamp subsidiary consisting of Bridger, Hotmix, Jamendo and Winamp.

=== 2025 ===
- 23 October - Llama Group SA rebrands to Winamp Group SA.

== List of properties formerly owned by Radionomy ==
In addition to its own online radio aggregation service, Radionomy owned audio and radio-related digital properties:

- Hotmixradio
- Jamendo
- SHOUTcast
- Targetspot
- Winamp
