= Distributed creativity =

Distributed creativity is a sociocultural framework for understanding how creativity emerges from the interactions of people, objects and their environment. It is a response to cognitive accounts of creativity exemplified by the widely used four Ps framework. According to Vlad Petre Glǎveanu, "instead of an individual, an objects or a place in which to 'locate' creativity, [the] aim here is to distribute it between people, objects and places."

== Details ==
Distributed creativity is not one artist working on one object but rather a group of authors contributing to an artwork. In media art, one can trace a movement from artwork to network. The obsession with objects as described by Walter Benjamin is replaced with an enthusiasm for the process of interaction. Bill Nichols describes the latter in his essay "The Work of Culture in the Age of Cybernetic Systems."

Distributed Creativity has recently been used to describe network performance practices, especially by composers and performers working in the area of network music performance. With the idea of distributing performers across the globe, also come considerations of how people listen when in different spaces, which has been explored under the theme of networked listening. A special issue in the 2009 publication of Contemporary Music Review on network performance investigated the topic of network music.

Theorists are considering how distributing performers and audiences in a performance space impacts on the experience of music making on behalf of the performers but also on the audience. Discussions on how each performance or concert space is built or set up are discussed under the theme of network dramaturgy.

There are several centres around the world that have dedicated network performance spaces and teams researching how to make music with people in distributed environments, for instance SoundWIRE Research Group at CCRMA, Stanford University and the Sonic Arts Research Centre in Belfast.

== See also ==
- Collective creativity
- Crowdsourcing
- Crowd intelligence
- Improvisation (music)
- Mass psychology
- Musical collective

== External links and references ==
- "What networks need to thrive". Still Water. 2024-12-24.
- Schroeder, Franziska (2013). "Network[ed] Listening—Towards a De-centering of Beings". Contemporary Music Review. 32 (2–03): 215–229. doi:10.1080/07494467.2013.775807.
- Renwick, Robin. (2012). “SOURCENODE: A NETWORK SOURCED APPROACH TO NETWORK MUSIC PERFORMANCE (NMP).hdl:2027/spo.bbp2372.2012.057.
- Rebelo, Pedro; Robert King (2010). "Anticipation in networked musical performance."". Proceedings of the 2010 international conference on Electronic Visualisation and the Arts. British Computer Society.
- Rebelo, P. (2009). "Editorial". Contemporary Music Review. 28 (4–5): 349–350. doi:10.1080/07494460903422123.
- Schroeder, F. (2009). "Dramaturgy as a Model for Geographically Displaced Collaborations: Views from Within and Views from Without1". Contemporary Music Review. 28 (4–5): 377–385. doi:10.1080/07494460903422263.
- Rebelo, Schroeder, Renaud (2008). NETWORK DRAMATURGY: BEING ON THE NODE
- Schroeder, Franziska et al. (2007). Addressing the Network: Performative Strategies for Playing APART. 2007 ICMC Paper Presentation.
- Alexander Carôt; Pedro Rebelo; Alain Renaud (2007). "Networked music performance: State of the art". Audio Engineering Society Conference: 30th International Conference. Intelligent Audio Environments Publisher.
- Sawyer, R. Keith; DeZutter, Stacy (May 2009). "Distributed creativity: How collective creations emerge from collaboration". Psychology of Aesthetics, Creativity, and the Arts. 3 (2): 81–92. doi:10.1037/a0013282.
