= Justin Frankel =

Computer programmer known for Winamp and Gnutella

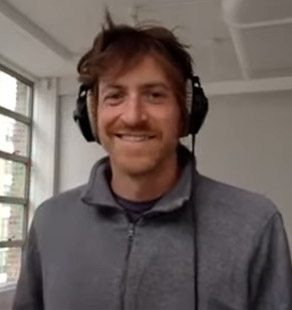
- Frankel in 2022
- Born: 1978 (age 47–48)
- Education: University of Utah
- Occupation: Programmer
- Notable work: Winamp, Gnutella, SHOUTcast, REAPER
- Title: Founder of Cockos
- Website: www.1014.org

Justin Frankel (born 1978) is an American computer programmer best known for his work on the Winamp media player application and for inventing the Gnutella peer-to-peer network. Frankel is also the founder of Cockos Incorporated, which creates music production and development software such as the REAPER digital audio workstation, the NINJAM collaborative music tool and the Jesusonic expandable effects processor.

In 2002, he was named in the TR100 as one of the top 100 innovators in the world under the age of 35.

== Early life ==
Justin Frankel was born in 1978 and grew up in Sedona, Arizona. Frankel had an aptitude for computers at an early age. His skill eventually led him to running the student computer network of Verde Valley School, which he attended, as well as writing an email application for the students.

== Winamp ==
After graduating high school with a 3.9 GPA, he attended the University of Utah in 1996, where he majored in computer science, but dropped out after two quarters. A few months later, he released the first version of WinAMP under his newly formed company's name Nullsoft. By 1998, more than fifteen million people had downloaded the program. Since many people had sent in the $10 donation suggested in return for using the program, Frankel earned tens of thousands of dollars a month.

Frankel, along with Tom Pepper (who played a big part of the Winamp development and distribution), later completed SHOUTcast, which allowed ordinary users with an Internet connection to broadcast, or "stream", audio over the Internet. He also created the Advanced Visualization Studio, a plugin for Winamp which enabled users to create their own music visualizations in real-time, without any programming knowledge required.

== Sale of Nullsoft to AOL ==
In June 1999 AOL simultaneously acquired Nullsoft and Spinner.com in a combined purchase worth approximately $400 million. In a July 21, 1999 SEC filing by AOL, the transaction was recorded as a payment of 2,863,053 shares of AOL common stock to the 54 stockholders in the two companies being acquired. On July 20, 1999, the last reported sale price for AOL common stock was $113.1875 per share. Frankel's stake of 522,661 shares in the acquisition was worth approximately $59 million.

== AOL ==
On March 14, 2000, Frankel and Nullsoft colleague Tom Pepper released Gnutella, a public peer-to-peer file-sharing application, using Nullsoft's corporate web servers, without AOL's knowledge. Gnutella was a new peer-to-peer file-sharing system like the original Napster system, which was used by users to share their MP3 collections with everyone who ran a Napster client. Unlike Napster, however, Gnutella allowed users to share any type of file, not just MP3s. It also did not have the single point of failure that Napster had: centralized servers that indexed where all the shared content was stored. Whereas Napster was shut off just by turning off the centralized index servers owned by Napster, gnutella did not rely on any centralized servers to find out what users had what content, so once a Gnutella network was created, it could not be shut off.

Since AOL was at the time merging with Time Warner, Gnutella seemed like a conflict of interest to Nullsoft's parent company, which knew that Time Warner was one of the parties taking legal action against Napster at the time. AOL ordered Gnutella to be taken off the Nullsoft corporate servers. However, thousands of people had already downloaded the software before it was removed from Nullsoft's web site. The source code was released later, supposedly under the GPL. Gnutella continued to be developed without Frankel's assistance, and became one of the most popular peer-to-peer file sharing networks of its time; compatible clients that were developed included BearShare, Morpheus, Gnucleus and LimeWire.

AOL watched Frankel very closely after that, taking down other projects that he tried to release to the public, such as an MP3 search engine and a patch for AOL Instant Messenger to block advertisements in the application. Frankel threatened to resign on June 2, 2003, after AOL removed his program WASTE, a private peer-to-peer file-sharing program, from the Nullsoft website. He stayed with AOL after that in order to complete Winamp version 5.0, a hybrid of the Winamp v2.x series and Winamp v3.

On December 9, 2003 AOL shut down Nullsoft's San Francisco offices and laid off 450 employees.

Frankel announced his resignation from AOL on January 22, 2004 on his blog, stating "Won't repeat it here (in two words: I've resigned). So begins chapter 3... or something cliché/poetic there. Or wait, does I've count as a single word? ha ha."

== Post-AOL ==
Some of Frankel's current projects in development are a programmable effects processor called Jesusonic and a piece of software named NINJAM which allows several musicians to make music together via the Internet.

Under his new company, Cockos, he has been developing REAPER, a digital audio workstation for Microsoft Windows, MacOS, and Linux.
