= Atari Video Music =

First electronic music visualizer

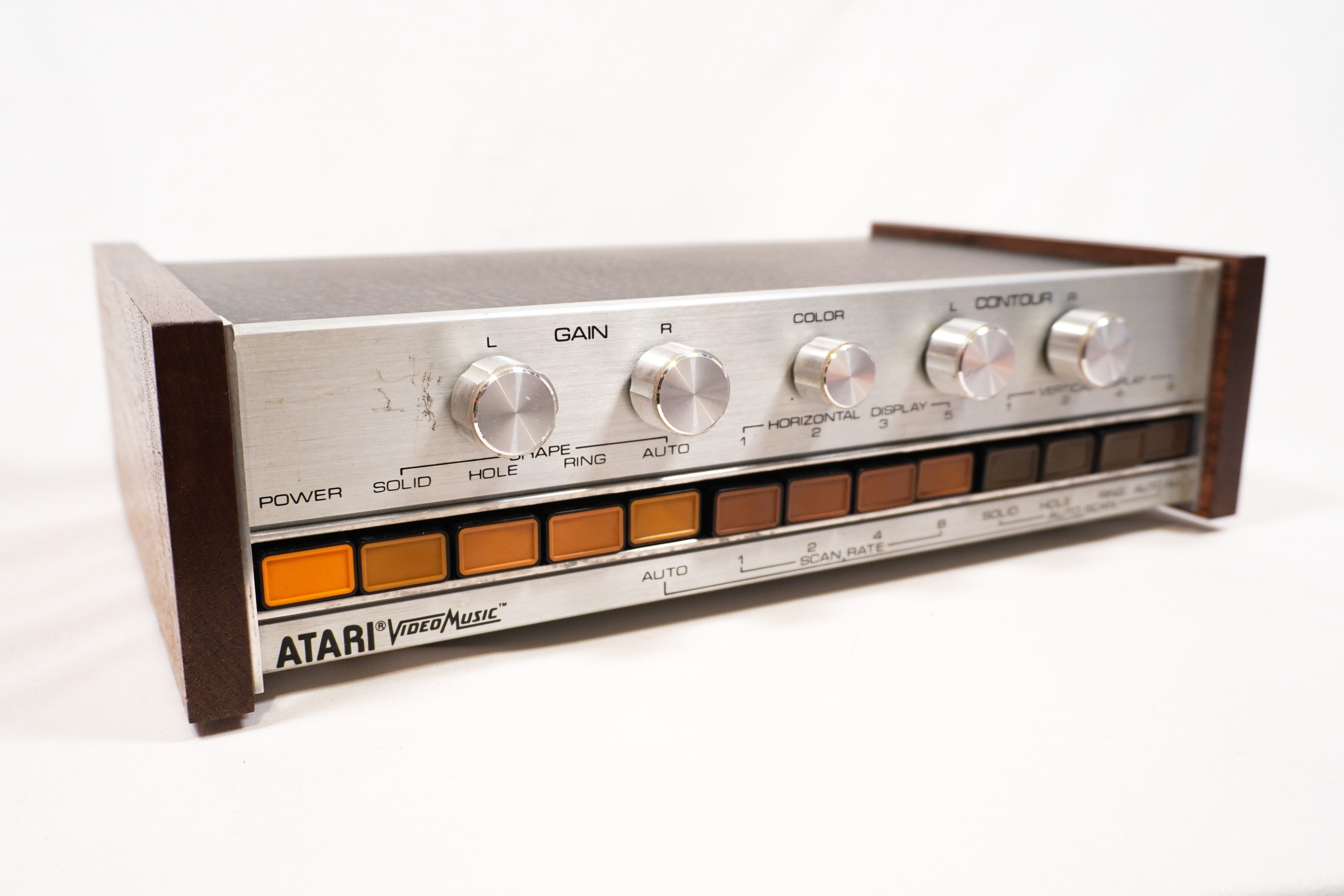
- The Atari Video Music
- Developer: Robert J. Brown
- Manufacturer: Atari, Inc.
- Type: music visualizer
- Released: 1977; 49 years ago
- Introductory price: $169.95; equivalent to $903 in 2025

Video output of Atari Video Music, recorded in 2021

The Atari Video Music (Model C240) is the earliest commercial electronic music visualizer released. It was manufactured by Atari, Inc., and released in 1977 for $169.95. The system creates an animated visual display that responds to musical input from a Hi-Fi stereo system for the visual entertainment of consumers.

== Overview ==
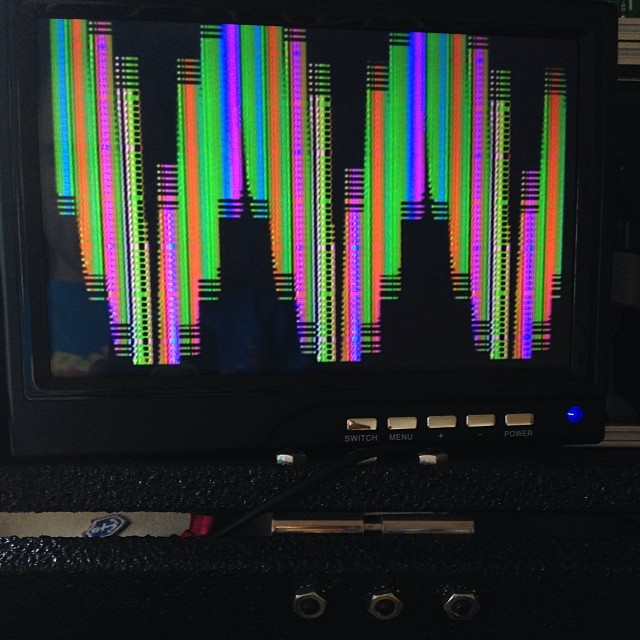
A sample of output (without sound input)

By interpreting an input musical waveform, the Video Music translates the levels of musical intensity and mellowness into colors and shapes that are output to a graphical display. The console is attached to an audio source and then operated by an adhesive-backed switch box that is glued to the back of a television display. Audio signal visualizations take the basic form of a two-part diamond. The outer part represents the left audio channel while the right channel is represented by the inner part. Varying colors and shapes provide a wide variety of patterns, designs, and images depending on the audio sample played.

After the unit is powered on, a toggle switch may be used to select between "TV" (music visualization inactive), and "Game" (music visualization active). When in the "Game" position, visual data is broadcast on VHF channel 3 by default, but may be set to channel 4. Unlike Atari's previous video game systems, the Video Music system's switch box featured a 75 Ohm pass-through F connector allowing the television antenna or cable to remain attached and thereby eliminating the tiresome process of detaching and reattaching the cable every time the user switched from watching normal television broadcasts to using the visualizer. Any audio source may be used for visualization including Atari's video game system audio, and visualizations can either be watched "live" on a television screen or recorded on a VCR by using a balun converter.

=== Technical details ===
The Video Music hooks up to a TV through an RF switchbox. The other hook ups are left and right RCA jack inputs that hook up to an audio amplifier's RCA outputs. The face is a brushed metal plate and the sides are particle board with walnut veneer. The unit is turned on by pushing a power button, and visualization is controlled by five potentiometer knobs and 12 additional push-buttons.

The knob controls are as follows:

- Gain: Two knobs controlling the left and right audio input signals strength. These increase the size of the visual pattern.
- Color: One knob controlling color. This increases the number of available colors from a solid color to a rainbow of colors.
- Contour: Two knobs controlling the left and right audio input signals visual representations shapes from soft to geometric. These act to soften shapes or increase geometric complexity of the design.

The push button controls are as follows:

- Power: Turns unit on and off.
- Shape (solid): Any Shape or Image that is displayed will be solid
- Shape (hole): One stereo channel controls the outside with a hole in the center controlled by the other stereo channel.
- Shape (ring): Both stereo channels will represent two outline shapes that retain their thickness with the pulse of the music
- Shape (auto): The system automatically cycles at random between the different Shape settings as well as the next eight buttons:
- Horizontal 1: Displays one generated image.
- Horizontal 2: Displays two horizontal generated images
- Horizontal 3: Displays three horizontal generated images
- Horizontal 5: Displays five horizontal generated images
- Vertical 1: Displays one generated image
- Vertical 2: Displays two vertical generated images
- Vertical 4: Displays four vertical generated images
- Vertical 8: Displays eight vertical generated images

The last four buttons have an auxiliary function when the "Auto" button is pushed. In this mode, three of these buttons represent Solid, Hole and Ring. When the unit is in auto, it will retain the shape of one of those three shapes. The fourth button is "Auto All". This sends the unit into semi-automatic mode, cycling through shape, horizontal and vertical options but not affecting the user-set gain, color or contour settings.

== Development history ==
Developed under the codename Project Mood, the Video Music unit was designed by Robert Brown, a developer of the home version of Pong. According to Atari design engineer, Al Alcorn, when Atari was on tour promoting the device, a Sears representative asked what the developers were smoking when they invented it. With that, a technician stepped forward holding up a lit joint.

In March 1978, the unit was described in a patent under the name "Audio activated video display". It is considered to have been commercially unsuccessful and production was discontinued after only one year on the market.

== Reception ==
The Video Music system was reviewed in Video magazine as part of a special "VideoTest Report" in 1978. The reviewers gave it mild but positive coverage, describing it as "a well-constructed machine and an interesting component to be used as an adjunct to stereo sound," but warning that "once the novelty wears off the display can become somewhat monotonous." The same report recommended it for "those who find it relaxing, stimulating, or therapeutic to watch psychedelic displays."

== Appearance in popular culture ==
- Devo used a Video Music screen as a background in the video for "The Day My Baby Gave Me a Surprise". It appears again, connected to a vocoder, in the music video for "Beautiful World".
- Daft Punk used a screen in their video "Robot Rock".
- The diamond pattern visuals from Video Music can be seen in several scenes from the 1979 movie Over the Edge where the mute character Johnny watches the visuals in his bedroom.
- The diamond pattern visuals from Video Music appeared in an episode of The X-Files (Season 1 Episode 7, "Ghost in the Machine") as part of a video surveillance system.

== See also ==
- Music visualization
