= JamKazam =

- Initial release: March 12, 2014; 11 years ago
- Stable release: 1.0.3950
- Operating system: Windows; macOS
- Website: jamkazam.com

JamKazam is proprietary networked music performance software that enables real-time rehearsing, jamming and performing with musicians at remote locations, overcoming latency - the time lapse that occurs while (compressed) audio streams travel to and from each musician.

JamKazam is available in free and premium versions; the free version is peer-to-peer only, while the paid version offers the client-server model too, choosing whichever route is faster. It also allows streaming to social media, and has pre-recorded "JamTracks" for subscribers to play along to.

The founders ran out of capital in 2017, but like other software of this type, saw huge growth during the 2020 COVID-19 pandemic, and managed to raise over $100,000 through crowdfunding on GoFundMe.

== See also ==
- Jamstud.io
- Jamulus
- Ninjam / Ninbot
- SonoBus
- HPSJam
- Koord
- Comparison of Remote Music Performance Software
