= MacAmp =

MP3 player software for Classic Mac OS

- Developer: Subband Software
- Stable release: 2.0
- Operating system: Mac OS
- Type: Audio player
- License: Proprietary
- Website: Subband Technologies (defunct)

MacAmp is an early GUI-based MP3 audio player, first released on April 13, 1997, for the Macintosh by Dmitry Boldyrev of Nullsoft (and later Subband). Its MP3 decoding capability was based on the PlayMedia Systems AMP MPEG-2, Layers 1, 2 and 3 decoder.

By 1999, MacAmp was cited as a "premier MP3 player" and the most popular MP3 player for the Macintosh.

In September 1999, a revamped version of MacAmp was released under the name "Macast".

== See also ==
- Comparison of media players
- DOSamp
- Winamp
