= Portable Sound Format =

Music file format

The Portable Sound Format (PSF) is a music file format ripped directly from video games from a variety of video game consoles. The format was originally used for PlayStation video games, but has since been adapted to support other systems.

The PSF format was publicly documented by Neill Corlett in 2003, who also wrote a Winamp plug-in named "Highly Experimental" that plays PSF1 and PSF2 files.

Generally, PSF files contain a number of samples and a music sequencer player program. This takes far less space than an equivalent streamed format of the same music (WAV, MP3) while still sounding high fidelity. Background music stored in PSF files can usually be looped forever, as the sequencer handles its own loop points.

Several PSF sub-formats also have a miniPSF/PSFlib capability, wherein data used by multiple tracks is stored only once in an accompanying PSFlib file. Further differences are stored in a miniPSF file, which can be compressed via zlib to further increase storage efficiency.

A PSF2 file is the PlayStation 2 equivalent of a PSF. PSF2 is internally structured as a file system, rather than PSF, which is a single PS executable. PSF's native sample rate is 44,100 Hz, while PSF2's is 48,000 Hz. Rates may vary from 8,000 Hz to 96,000 Hz.

Both PSF and PSF2 files contain a header which specifies the type of video game system the file contains data for, and an optional set of tags at the end which can give detailed information such as game name, artist and length.

== PSF sub-formats ==
PSF initially stood only for "PlayStation Sound Format", but with the addition of the PSF2, SSF (Sega Saturn Sound Format), DSF (Dreamcast Sound Format), USF (Nintendo Ultra 64 Sound Format), QSF (Capcom Q-Sound Format), GSF (Game Boy Advance Sound Format), and 2SF (Nintendo DS Sound Format) sub-formats, the more generic backronym "Portable Sound Format" was developed. As a result, PSF and PSF1 interchangeably refer to PlayStation sound data files.

=== GSF ===
GBA Sound Format (GSF) is an emulated Game Boy Advance audio format developed by Caitsith2 and Zoopd. The basic GSF file structure is a sub-format of PSF.

GSF players emulate the files as sound-only Game Boy Advance ROMs, and as such can be processor intensive when compared to mainstream audio formats.

=== USF ===
Nintendo Ultra64 Sound Format (USF) is a file format by Adam Gashlin that contains the sound-generating code from a Nintendo 64 video game. The basic USF file structure is a sub-format of PSF.
