= Shoutcast =

Media streaming software

- Original authors: Nullsoft (Stephen 'Tag' Loomis, Tom Pepper and Justin Frankel)
- Developer: Radionomy
- Stable release: 2.6.1 (Build 777) / January 30, 2022; 4 years ago
- Type: Streaming media
- License: Registerware
- Website: shoutcast.com

Shoutcast (formerly stylized as SHOUTcast) is a service for streaming media over the Internet to media players, using its own cross-platform proprietary software. It allows digital audio content, primarily in MP3 or High-Efficiency Advanced Audio Coding format. The most common use of Shoutcast is for creating or listening to Internet audio broadcasts; however, there are also video streams. The software is available to use for free or as a paid cloud service with additional professional features.

In the early days of esports for video games, Shoutcast was used by some to stream play-by-play commentary, leading to the term "shoutcaster" as a name for esports commentators.

== History ==
Created in 1998, Shoutcast's streaming protocol uses metadata tags and responses that all start with ICY, which stands for "I Can Yell." Nullsoft was purchased by AOL on June 1, 1999.

On January 14, 2014, AOL sold Nullsoft to Belgian online radio aggregator Radionomy Group; no financial details were publicly announced. In 2018 the software was rebranded from its original name of SHOUTcast to Shoutcast. In 2020 Radionomy shut down its own streaming service and migrated to the Shoutcast platform.

== Software ==
The Shoutcast software uses a client–server model, with each component communicating via a network protocol that intermingles audio or video data with metadata such as song titles and the station name. It uses HTTP as a transport protocol.

Shoutcast servers and clients are available for FreeBSD, Linux, macOS, Microsoft Windows, and Solaris. There are client-only versions for Android, BlackBerry OS, iOS (iPad, iPhone), Palm OS and webOS (Radio Hibiki), PlayStation Portable, Windows Mobile, Symbian S60 and UIQ, Nintendo DS (DSOrganize), and Wii.

The output format is supported by multiple clients, including Nullsoft's own Winamp as well as Amarok, Exaile, foobar2000, iTunes, Songbird, Totem, XMMS, and Zinf. If the client does not support the Shoutcast protocol, then the Shoutcast server sends the stream without the metadata, allowing it to be heard and viewed in clients such as Windows Media Player. Shoutcast servers are usually linked to by means of playlist files, which are small text files (usually with extensions .pls or .m3u) that contain the URL of the Shoutcast server. When that URL is visited in a Web browser which identifies itself as Mozilla-compatible (as most do), the server will return a generated Shoutcast server info/status page, rather than streaming audio.

In 2010, VideoLAN dropped support for Shoutcast from VLC media player at AOL's request, as Shoutcast's license forbade its integration into other software that contained free or open-source components, additionally specifying that it "forces us to integrate the spyware and adware based Shoutcast Radio Toolbar inside your browser". An alternative to Shoutcast is Icecast.

== Popularity ==
A feature of Shoutcast servers is the ability to optionally publish server information, including the current number of listeners, in a directory of stations that Shoutcast maintains on their website. Site visitors can pick a station to listen to and download a playlist file for use in their own Shoutcast-capable media player.

In 2011, up to 900,000 concurrent listeners could be seen on public Shoutcast streams during peak hours. The maximum and minimum number of listeners fluctuates widely during a day, with roughly three times as many listeners during peak hours as at low use times.

As of June 2022, 85,317 stations were streaming using Shoutcast.

== See also ==
- Icecast
- List of Internet radio stations
- List of streaming media systems
- Nullsoft Streaming Video
- Edcast
