= Spinner (website) =

Defunct music and entertainment website

- Type: Subsidiary
- Industry: Media player
- Founded: United States
- Defunct: April 26, 2013
- Fate: Merged into LiveXLive
- Headquarters: United States
- Parent: AOL
- Website: spinner.com

Spinner was an online music and entertainment service. An AOL Music property, it was acquired by AOL on June 1, 1999, along with Nullsoft for $400 million. Based in San Francisco, California, the website was the first Internet music service and was the largest by 2001, while offering promotional features from high-profile recording artists. In 2002, AOL combined Spinner with the former's Netscape portal to form Netscape Radio. Spinner broadcast over 100 radio stations, including Radio CMJ.

== History ==
In 2008, Spinner was revamped by AOL as a music website aimed at the "music aficionado". The website offers exclusive interviews of recording artists, streams of albums and live performances, and a free music download daily.

== Shut down ==
Spinner, along with all AOL music sites, was abruptly shut down in April 2013. The URLs to all former AOL music sites, including Spinner, were re-directed to aolradio.slacker.com starting in August 2013. Several AOL Music blogs, along with Comics Alliance, were sold to Townsquare Media in June 2013.

== Bibliography ==
- Alderman, John (July 11, 2002). Sonic Boom: Napster, Mp3, And The New Pioneers Of Music. Basic Books. ISBN 0738207772.
- Axford, Elizabeth C. (July 1, 2004). Song Sheets to Software: A Guide to Print Music, Software, and Web Sites for Musicians. Scarecrow Press. ISBN 0810850273.
- Calhoun, Scott, ed. (December 16, 2011). Exploring U2: Is This Rock 'n' Roll?. Scarecrow Press. ISBN 978-0810881570.
- Fries, Bruce; Fries, Marty (April 26, 2005). Digital Audio Essentials. O'Reilly Media. ISBN 0596008562.
- Khosrowpour, Mehdi (April 3, 2006). Cases on Electronic Commerce Technologies and Applications. Idea Group Inc. ISBN 1599044021.
