= Nullsoft =

American software company

Nullsoft, Inc.
- Type: Private
- Industry: Computer software
- Founded: 1997; 29 years ago
- Defunct: 2014; 12 years ago
- Successor: Radionomy
- Headquarters: Sedona, Arizona
- Key people: Justin Frankel; Tom Pepper
- Products: Winamp, SHOUTcast, and others
- Owner: Radionomy Group

Nullsoft, Inc. was an American software company founded in Sedona, Arizona in 1997 by programmer Justin Frankel. Its products included the Winamp media player and the SHOUTcast MP3 streaming media server.

== History ==
In 1997, Justin Frankel, a programmer from Sedona, Arizona, founded Nullsoft, Inc in his home town. The company's name is a parody of Microsoft. Mike the Llama is the company's mascot. (Note: this is frequently referred to in promotional material (especially for Winamp) citing llamas. Frankel introduced the llama in Winamp's startup sound clip, inspired by the lyrics of Wesley Willis: "Winamp, it really whips the llama's ass!") The company launched the media player Winamp that year, developed by Frankel and Dmitry Boldyrev. It was the second real-time MP3 player for Windows, following WinPlay3. Frankel's principal collaborator at Nullsoft was programmer Tom Pepper, with whom he co-developed the SHOUTcast streaming server and, in March 2000, the Gnutella peer-to-peer client.

Nullsoft, along with Spinner.com, was sold to America Online (AOL) on June 1, 1999, for around $400 million. It became an AOL subsidiary, subsequently becoming a division of AOL Music. Its headquarters were moved to San Francisco, California.

According to Bonnie Burton, then editor of the website Winamp.com, 2001 was a period of heightened tension between the Nullsoft staff and upper management, because of Frankel's uncompromising views about file-sharing. He had developed Gnutella in 2000 and released it using company infrastructure. Ars Technica also noted that AOL failed to effectively monetize or find a larger audience for Winamp. Nullsoft's San Francisco offices were closed in December 2003, with a near-concurrent departure of Frankel and the original Winamp development team. In 2013, some AOL Music sites were shut down and others sold to Townsquare Media.

In November 2013, an unofficial report surfaced that Microsoft was in talks with AOL to acquire Nullsoft. On January 14, 2014, it was officially announced that Belgian online radio aggregator Radionomy had bought Winamp and Shoutcast, formerly owned by Nullsoft. No financial details were publicly announced.

== Software ==
=== Winamp ===
Winamp is a media player released by Nullsoft in April 1997. By 1999, it was downloaded by 15 million people. The company released several new versions of the Winamp player and grew its monthly unique subscriber base to 60 million users by late 2004. Winamp was discontinued by Nullsoft around 2013. New versions of Winamp, which started releasing in 2023, are by a different developer named Llama Group.

=== SHOUTcast ===
SHOUTcast (currently Shoutcast) is an MP3 streaming media server.

=== Nullsoft Scriptable Install System ===
In later years, their open source installer system, the Nullsoft Scriptable Install System (NSIS) became an alternative to commercial products like InstallShield, InnoSetup, InstallSimple, InstallAware and Advanced Installer. In January 2006, NSIS was named Project of the Month by SourceForge.

=== Other ===
Nullsoft's developments after acquisition included the Nullsoft Streaming Video (NSV) format, which was intended to stream media that used any audio or video codec. In 2002, the press reported a technology called Ultravox being developed by Nullsoft. The company also created the peer-to-peer networks Gnutella and WASTE. Although AOL tried to limit the distribution of Gnutella and WASTE, the Ultravox technology was reportedly used for some AOL radio services in 2003. A service called Nullsoft Television was announced in 2003 using NSV.
