= Ninjam =

NINJAM
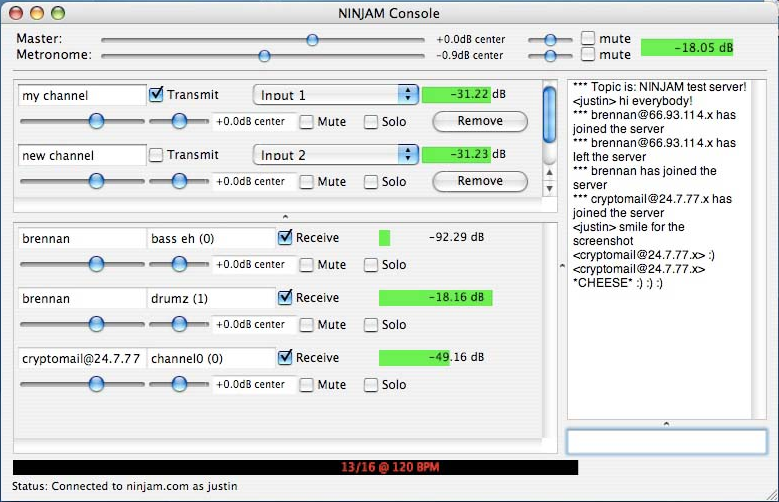
- NINJAM Console
- Original author(s): Brennan Underwood, Justin Frankel, with notable work by Tom Pepper
- Developer(s): various
- Initial release: July 9, 2005; 20 years ago
- Stable release: v0.06 (client & server), / July 20, 2005 (client), May 3, 2007 (server)
- Operating system: Windows, Mac OS X, Linux
- Available in: English
- Type: Collaborative musical jamming
- License: GNU General Public License
- Website: www.ninjam.com

NINJAM stands for Novel Intervallic Network Jamming Architecture for Music. The software and systems comprising NINJAM provide a non-realtime mechanism for exchanging audio data across the internet, with a synchronisation mechanism based on musical form. It provides a way for musicians to "jam" (improvise) together over the Internet; it pioneered the concept of "virtual-time" jamming. It was originally developed by Brennan Underwood, Justin Frankel, and Tom Pepper.

== Principle ==
Collaboratively creating many forms of music naturally relies on players' ability to keep time with each other. Excessive latency between players causes natural time keeping to be thrown awry. Typical network engineering practice does not allow for sufficiently low-latency data exchange mechanism even within cities, and the speed of light makes it impossible over regional or global distances. In order to approach latency-free collaboration, NINJAM extends the latency, by delaying all received audio until it can be synchronised with other players. The delay is based on the musical form. This synchronisation means that each player hears the others in a session and can play along with them. NINJAM defines the form in terms of the "interval" - the number of beats to be recorded before synchronising with other players. For example, with an interval of 16, four bars of music in 4/4 time would be recorded from each player, then played back to all others.

== Reception ==
The process was described in Wired as "glitch-free", and "designed for musicians who enjoy realtime collaboration." In MIT Technology Review, the software's users are described as "really loyal" due to its free and open source status. Other music product vendors have added support for NINJAM; Expert Sleepers, a vendor of electronic music hardware and software, added plugin support for NINJAM in 2006.

== Technical background ==
Each player in a NINJAM session feeds audio data from their client to a server via a TCP/IP connection to a specific port (commonly in the range 2049 upwards, depending on the host).

The "client" here is only the component that the player uses to connect to a NINJAM server, encode and transmit their audio stream, receive and decode remote players' streams and handle the chat session (IRC-like). Each player will also need some way of feeding audio information to the NINJAM client - either by using the client as a plugin in a DAW or by using the standalone version with a direct audio input.

Each client's data is synchronised against a distributed clock. This clocking is then used to distribute the data out to all the other clients so that they can play all the remote streams in sync. The server does little apart from manage connections, chat and data streaming.

== Overview of usage ==
=== Clients and client setup considerations ===
==== Common considerations ====
All clients feed data at 0 dB to the server, regardless of local monitoring levels. When setting up, the NINJAM client "local" level is set to 0 dB. "Local" does not affect transmitted volume. The slider labelled "local" only affects what the user hears locally, not what others hear. The user must adjust their input level - before the NINJAM client in the signal path - to affect what remote players are hearing. There is limited headroom in an audio channel, so it is considered good practice never to let audio level peak above 12 dB, and to set one's "loud" level at around 18 dB; this ensures space in the mix for others.

==== REAPER-tied VST effect ====
VST effects are a commonly used option (based on number of posts on the NINJAM support forums) but requires that the user install REAPER.

==== Open Source AU plugin ====
Derived from the Open Source Standalone version, works on Mac AU hosts. Similar considerations to REAPER-tied VST effect above.

==== Open Source standalone clients ====
Standalone clients are available for Windows, Mac OS and Linux. As the Linux version works with JACK, it can have audio routed to it from any JACK client. On Windows, use with virtual audio sources is problematic as there is no comparatively easy routing mechanism. Hence it is more suited to real instruments, where it provides a simpler alternative to the complexity of running a DAW just to access NINJAM.

=== Server and server set-up requirements ===
More detailed set-up and configuration is available on the NINJAM web site.

==== Bandwidth ====
According to Cockos, of bandwidth requirements, outbound bandwidth is the major requirement. A 4-person session will require approximately 768 kbit/s of outbound and 240 kbit/s of inbound bandwidth. An 8-person session will require approximately 3 Mbit/s of outbound (and 600 kbit/s inbound) bandwidth.

==== Operating systems and hardware requirements ====
===== Win32 =====
Windows 2000 or later, CPU 500 MHz, RAM 4 MB, NINJAM v0.06

===== OS X =====
OS X 10.3 or later, G3. RAM 4 MB NINJAM v0.01a ALPHA for OS X

===== Linux =====
It is claimed that the server source code compiles on Linux, FreeBSD, Darwin/OS X, and Windows. There is no information available regarding what versions of Linux & FreeBSD are required nor of the hardware required to support the application running under those operating systems.

== Development status ==
This is a GPL project, so source code is available. Since 2012 third-party clients (wahjam, Jamtaba, Zenjam and Ninjam-js) have been created. The Cockos Ninjam page lists the GitHub page justinfrankel/ninjam as the "official github mirror," and that page shows a commit in late April, 2020.

== Content ==
The NINJAM servers hosted by Cockos record and index their content at NINJAM AutoSong under the Creative Commons license; the music files are hosted at The Internet Archive. As of January 2010 there were over 23,000 hours of content, or approximately 1.2 TB. As of 2021, recording activity is ongoing.
