= Winamp =

Media player for Microsoft Windows

- Logo used in the Winamp player

- Winamp 5.9.2 running on Windows 10 (Classic skin)
- Original author: Nullsoft
- Developer: Winamp Group
- Release: April 21, 1997; 29 years ago
- Stable release: 5.9.2 Build 10042 (April 26, 2023; 3 years ago) [±]
- Preview release: Preview - Version 1.99.52.24626 (August 3, 2026)
- Written in: C, C++
- Operating system: Windows, Android, MS-DOS (DOSamp), Mac OS (MacAmp), Linux
- Size: 16.3 MB
- Available in: 18 languages
- List of languages English, Simplified Chinese, Traditional Chinese, Dutch, French, German, Hungarian, Italian, Indonesian, Japanese, Korean, Polish, Brazilian Portuguese, Romanian, Russian, Spanish, Swedish, Turkish
- Type: Media player
- License: Proprietary (1997–present); Winamp Collaborative License 1.0.1, source available (September–October 2024)
- Website: winamp.com/player - Last official update was 2023. getwacup.com - Now community sourced and serviced often.

Winamp is a media player for Microsoft Windows originally developed by Justin Frankel and Dmitry Boldyrev by their company Nullsoft, which they later sold to AOL in 1999 for $80 million. It was then acquired by Radionomy in 2014, now known as the Winamp Group. Since version 2, it has been sold as freemium and supports extensibility with plug-ins and skins, and features music visualization, playlist and a media library, supported by a large online community.

Version 1 of Winamp was released in 1997, along with basic counterparts for MS-DOS and Macintosh, and quickly grew popular with over 3 million downloads, paralleling the developing trend of MP3 file sharing. Winamp 2.0 was released on September 8, 1998. The 2.x versions were widely used and made Winamp one of the most downloaded Windows applications. By 2000, Winamp had over 25 million registered users and by 2001 it had 60 million users. A poor reception to the 2002 rewrite, Winamp3, was followed by the release of Winamp 5 in 2003, and a later release of version 5.5 in 2007. Winamp for Android was released in 2010. The last AOL-developed version, Winamp 5.666, was released in 2013.

After a five-year hiatus, Winamp 5.8 (written as Winamp 5.$\infin$) was leaked to the public in 2018 before its eventual release by Radionomy; development has since resumed with the latest version 5.9.2 released on April 26, 2023. Its developer Radionomy has since rebranded as Llama Group (later Winamp Group) and launched a streaming service that allows users to support artists by buying perks or NFTs. The service launched on the web in April 2023, followed by beta apps for Android and iOS in July 2023. In September 2024, Llama Group partially released the Winamp source code for Windows under a custom source-available license; the source repository was deleted soon afterwards following criticism for its license terms and inclusion of proprietary code.

== Features ==
Playback formats
Winamp supports music playback using MP3, MIDI, MOD, MPEG-1 audio layers 1 and 2, AAC, M4A, FLAC, WAV, and WMA. Winamp was one of the first widely used music players on Windows to support playback of Ogg Vorbis by default. It supports gapless playback for MP3 and AAC and ReplayGain for volume leveling across tracks. CD support includes playing and importing music from audio CDs, optionally with CD-Text, and burning music to CDs. The standard version limits maximum burn speed and datarate; the "Pro" version removes these limitations. Winamp supports playback of Windows Media Video and Nullsoft Streaming Video. For MPEG Video, AVI, and other unsupported video types, Winamp uses Microsoft's DirectShow API for playback, allowing playback of most of the video formats supported by Windows Media Player. 5.1 Surround sound is supported where formats and decoders allow.
Media Library
At installation, Winamp scans the user's system for media files to add to the Media Library database. It supports full Unicode filenames and Unicode metadata for media files. In the Media Library user interface pane, under Local Media, several selectors (Audio, Video, date, and frequency) permit display of subsets of media files with greater detail.
Adding album art and track tags
Get Album Art permits retrieval of cover art, and confirmation before adding the image to the database. Autotagging analyzes a track's audio using the Gracenote service and retrieves the song's ID2 and ID3 metadata.
Podcatcher
Winamp can also be used as RSS media feeds aggregator capable of displaying articles, downloading, or playing such content as streaming media. SHOUTcast Wire provides a directory and RSS subscription system for podcasts.
Media player device support
Winamp has extendable support for portable media players and Mass Storage Compliant devices, Microsoft PlaysForSure, and ActiveSync, and syncs unprotected music to the iPod.
Media Monitor
Winamp Media Monitor allows web-based browsing and bookmarking music blog websites and automatically offering for streaming or downloading all MP3 files there. The Media Monitor is preloaded with music blog URLs.
Winamp Remote
Winamp Remote allows remote playback (streaming) of unprotected media files on the user's PC via the Internet. Remote adjusts bitrate based on available bandwidth, and can be controlled by web interface, Wii, PlayStation 3, Xbox 360, and mobile phones.
Plug-ins
In February 1998, Winamp was rewritten as a "general-purpose audio player" with a plug-in architecture. This feature was received well by reviewers. Development was early, diverse, and rapid: 66 plugins were published by November 1998. The Winamp software development kit (SDK) allows software developers to create seven different types of plug-ins.
- Input: decodes specific file formats.
- Output: sends data to specific devices or files.
- Visualization: provides sound activated graphics.
- DSP/Effect: manipulates audio for special effects.
- General Purpose plug-ins add convenience or UI features (Media Library, alarm clock, or pause when logged out).
- Media Library plug-ins add functions to the Media Library plug-in.
- Portables plug-ins support portable media players.

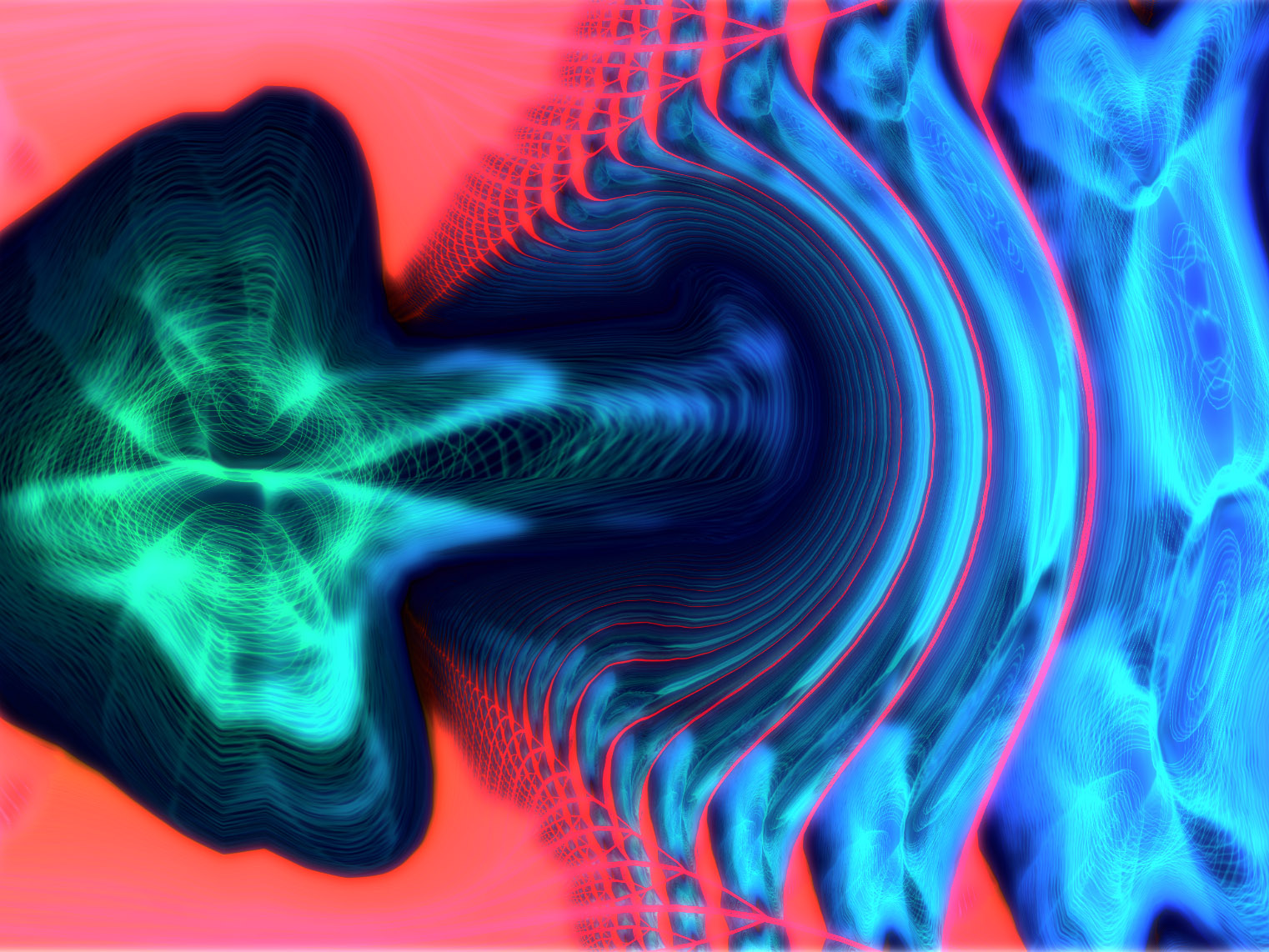
MilkDrop, a visualization plug-in in Winamp

Plug-in development support increased Winamp's flexibility – for example, the creation of specialized plug-ins for game console music files such as NSF, USF, GBS, GSF, SID, VGM, SPC, PSF, and PSF2.

Skins
Skins are bitmap files that alter the aesthetic design of the Winamp graphical user interface (GUI) and can add functionality with scripting. Winamp published documentation on skin creation in 1998 with the release of Winamp 2 and invited Winamp users to publish skins on Winamp.com. As of 2000, there were nearly 3,000 Winamp skins available. The ability to use skins contributed to Winamp's popularity early in MP3 development. With the increasing number of available skins, genres or categories of skins developed, such as "Stereo", "Anime", and "Ugly". Online communities of skin designers such as 1001Skins.com and Skinz.org have contributed thousands of designs; also at GnomeArt. Designers see skins as an opportunity to be creative: nontraditional examples have included Klingon, iPod, and Etch-a-sketch designs. The Winamp skin format is the most popular, the most commonly adopted by other media player software, and is usable across platforms. One example is the XMMS player for Linux and Unix systems, which can use unmodified Winamp 2 skin files. Winamp 5 supports two types of skins – "classic" skins designed to Winamp 2 specifications (static collections of bitmap images), and more flexible, freeform "modern" skins per the Winamp3 specification. Modern skins support true alpha channel transparency, scripting control, a docked toolbar, and other innovations to the user interface.

== History ==
=== Initial releases ===
WinAMP 0.2a, April 21, 1997

WinAMP 0.92, May 1997

Winamp was first released in 1997, when Justin Frankel and Dmitry Boldyrev, formerly students at the University of Utah, integrated their Windows user interface with the Advanced Multimedia Products ("AMP") MP3 file playback engine. The name Winamp (originally spelled WinAMP) was a portmanteau of "Windows" and "AMP". The minimalist WinAMP 0.20a was released as freeware on April 21, 1997.

Its windowless, menu bar-only interface showed only play (open), stop, pause, and unpause functions. A file specified on the command line or dropped onto its icon would be played. MP3 decoding was performed by the AMP decoding engine developed by Advanced Multimedia Products co-founder Tomislav Uzelac, which was free for non-commercial use. It was compatible with Windows 95 and Windows NT 4.0. Winamp was the second real-time MP3 player for Windows, the first being WinPlay3.

Within the standard Windows frame and menu bar, it had the beginnings of the "classic" Winamp GUI: dark gray rectangle with silver 3D-effect transport buttons, a red/green volume slider, time displayed in a green LED font, with track name, MP3 bitrate, and "mixrate" in green. Overlength titles appear as slowly scrolling text (or "marquee"). The skeuomorphic design somewhat resembles shelf stereos. There was no position bar, and a blank space where the spectrum analyzer and waveform analyzer would later appear. Multiple files on the command line or dropped onto its icon were enqueued in the playlist.

=== Winamp 1 ===
Winamp 1

Version 1.006 was released June 7, 1997, renamed "Winamp", with "amp" now in lowercase. It showed a spectrum analyzer and color-changing volume slider, but no waveform display. The AMP non-commercial license was included in its help menu.

According to Tomislav Uzelac, Frankel licensed the AMP 0.7 engine June 1, 1997. Frankel formally founded Nullsoft Inc. in January 1998 and continued development of Winamp, which changed from freeware to $10 shareware. Despite the fact that there would be no extra features by paying $10, Winamp's popularity and warm reception brought Nullsoft $100,000 a month that year from $10 paper checks in the mail from paying users.

In March, Brian Litman, managing co-founder with Uzelac of Advanced Multimedia Products, which by then had been merged into PlayMedia Systems, sent a cease-and-desist letter to Nullsoft, claiming unlawful use of AMP. Nullsoft responded that they had replaced AMP with Nitrane, Nullsoft's proprietary decoder, but Playmedia disputed this. Third-party reviews found that Nitrane had bugs that resulted in playing back MP3s incorrectly, and that this resulted in unstable tones being added to the playback, and undoubtedly therefore violated the ISO standard. This also means that Nitrane was unlikely to have been based on the AMP software, and was more likely evidence of a hastily written MP3 decoder that didn't concern itself with standards compliance.

Version 1.90, released March 31, 1998, was the first release as a general-purpose audio player, and documented on the Winamp website as supporting plugins, of which it included two input plugins (MOD and MP3) and a visualization plugin.

The installer for Version 1.91, released 18 days later, included wave, cdda, and Windows tray handling plugins, as well as the famous Wesley Willis-inspired DEMO.MP3 file "Winamp, it really whips the llama's ass". Mike the Llama is the company mascot.

By July 1998, Winamp's various versions had been downloaded over three million times.

=== Winamp 2 ===
Winamp 2.0, shown with default Base Skin

Winamp 2.0 was released on September 8, 1998. The new version improved the usability of the playlist, made the equalizer more accurate, and introduced more plug-ins. The modular windows for playlist and equalizer now matched the player's skin and could be moved around and be separated or "docked" to each other anywhere in any order.

The 2.x versions were widely used and made Winamp one of the most downloaded pieces of software for Windows. By the end of 1998, there were already over 60 plugins and hundreds of skins made for the software.

PlayMedia filed a federal lawsuit against Nullsoft in March 1999. In May 1999, PlayMedia was granted an injunction by Federal Judge A. Howard Matz against distribution of Nitrane by Nullsoft, and the same month the lawsuit was settled out-of-court with licensing and confidentiality agreements. Soon after, Nullsoft switched to an ISO decoder from the Fraunhofer-Gesellschaft, the developers of the MP3 format.

Winamp 2.10, released March 24, 1999, included a new version of the "Llama" demo.mp3 featuring a musical sting and bleating.

Nullsoft was purchased by AOL in June 1999 for $80 million in stock, with Nullsoft becoming a subsidiary. AOL itself merged with Time Warner in 2000.

Nullsoft relaunched the Winamp-specific winamp.com in December 1999 to provide easier access to skins, plug-ins, streaming audio, song downloads, forums, and developer resources.

As of June 22, 2000, Winamp surpassed 25 million registrants.

=== Winamp3 ===
Winamp3 with its default skin

The next major Winamp version, Winamp3 (so spelled to include mp3 in the name and to mark its separation from the Winamp 2 codebase), was released on August 9, 2002. It was a complete rewrite of version 2, newly based on the Wasabi application framework, which offered additional functionality and flexibility. Winamp3 was developed parallel to Winamp 2, but "many users found it consumed too many system resources and was unstable (or even lacked some valued functionality, such as the ability to count or find the total duration of tracks in a playlist)". Winamp3 had no backward compatibility with Winamp 2 plugins, and the SHOUTcast sourcing plugin was not supported. No Winamp3 version of SHOUTcast was ever released.

In response to users reverting to Winamp 2, Nullsoft continued the development of Winamp 2 to versions 2.9 and 2.91 in 2003, even alluding to it humorously. The beta versions 2.92 and 2.95 were released with the inclusion of some of the functionality of the upcoming Winamp 5. During this period the Wasabi cross-platform application framework and skinnable GUI toolkit was derived from parts of the Winamp3 source code. For Linux, Nullsoft released an alpha version of Winamp3 on October 9, 2001, but has not updated it despite continued user interest.

During this time Winamp faced stiff competition from Apple's iTunes.

=== Winamp 5 ===
Winamp 5 featuring Winamp Modern skin

Winamp 5 was based on the Winamp 2 codebase, but with Winamp3 features such as modern skins incorporated via a plugin, thus incorporating the main advantages of both products. Regarding the omission of a version 4, Nullsoft joked that "nobody wants to see a Winamp 4 skin" ("4 skin" being a pun on foreskin). It was also joked that "Winamp 5 is so good they skipped a number" and "Winamp 2+3=5,". Winamp 5.0 was released in December 2003. A blue themed "Modern" skin became the default interface. The media library was improved, CD burning and ripping was introduced, and other additions.

The original Nullsoft team quit in 2004. As of version 5.1, Winamp development is credited to Ben Allison (Benski) and Maksim Tyrtyshny.

From version 5.2 onwards, support for synchronizing with an iPod and other portable music players is built-in. This was developed by Will Fisher, as a re-write of his open source ml_ipod plug-in.

==== Winamp 5.5 ====
The Bento skin, introduced in Winamp 5.5

Winamp 5.5: The 10th Anniversary Edition was released on October 10, 2007, ten years after the first release of Winamp (a preview version had been released on September 10, 2007). New features to the player included album art support, improved localization support (with several officially localized Winamp releases, including German, Polish, Russian, and French), and a new default interface skin called "Bento" which unlike the previous skins is a unified player and media library in one window as opposed to a multi-window interface. This version dropped support for Windows 9x.

==== Winamp 5.6 ====
Winamp 5.621, when listening to the SHOUTcast stream

Winamp 5.6 was released in November 2010 and features Android Wi-Fi support and direct mouse wheel support. Fraunhofer AAC codec with VBR encoding support was implemented. Moreover, the option to write ratings to tags (for MP3, WMA/WMV, Ogg, and FLAC) was added. Hungarian and Indonesian installer translations and language packs were added.

With the release of Winamp version 5.66 on November 20, 2013, AOL announced that Winamp.com would shut down on December 20, 2013, and Winamp would cease to be offered for download after that date.

Winamp 5.666, running in Classic mode

Five days later, version 5.666 was released with the "Pro" and "Full" installers being one and the same, in the process removing OpenCandy, Emusic, AOL Search, and AOL Toolbar from the installation bundle. This was announced to be the last release of Winamp from AOL/Nullsoft.

==== Winamp 5.7 ====
There was a Winamp 5.7 beta program for an invitation-based Winamp Cloud feature, which would let Winamp play a user's entire cloud-stored music library across all supported devices. This feature would have allowed AOL to provide a music locker service that would essentially compete with other online music lockers. The beta program was cancelled months before the announcement to shut down the Winamp project.

=== Acquisition by Radionomy ===
On November 20, 2013, AOL announced that it would shut down Winamp.com on December 20, 2013, and the software would no longer be available for download nor supported by the company after that date. The following day, an unofficial report surfaced that Microsoft was in talks with AOL to acquire Nullsoft. Despite AOL's announcement, the Winamp site was not shut down as planned, and on January 14, 2014, it was officially announced that Belgian online radio aggregator Radionomy had bought the Nullsoft brand, which includes Winamp and SHOUTcast. No financial details were publicly announced. However, TechCrunch reported that the sale of Winamp and Shoutcast was worth between $5 and $10 million, with AOL taking a 12% stake (a financial, not strategic, investment) in Radionomy in the process.

Radionomy relaunched the Winamp website, and the software was available for download again. In December 2015, Vivendi bought a majority stake in Radionomy.

Following Radionomy's acquisition, no new releases would officially surface until Winamp 5.8 in 2018.

==== Winamp 5.8 ====
In September 2018, it was reported that a Winamp 5.8 beta build 3563 had been leaked to various file-sharing sites. The leaked build, bearing a build date of October 26, 2016, would be the first public build under Radionomy's umbrella, with changes including compatibility with Windows 8.1, 10 and 11, and the removal of the paid Winamp Pro.

Following the leak, Radionomy officially released Winamp 5.8 build 3660 on October 18, 2018.

==== Winamp 5.9 ====
Winamp 5.9 was released on September 9, 2022, with mostly under-the-hood improvements. The development team migrated the project from Visual Studio 2008 to Visual Studio 2019, in addition to improving support for Windows 11, high-resolution audio, and playback of HTTPS streams. The minimum supported operating system was increased to Windows 7 SP1.

On December 6, 2022, Winamp 5.9.1 was released, adding a music NFT playback feature. Users are able to add music NFTs on Ethereum and Polygon to the media library by connecting to the Metamask wallet.

In April 2023, Winamp 5.9.2 was officially released, which, according to the developers themselves, is a minor update to the previous version.

=== Winamp service ===
Modernized logo used by the Winamp website and service. The media player retains the classic logo.

On October 15, 2018, Radionomy's CEO Alexandre Saboundjian announced that a new version of Winamp – then called Winamp 6 – would be released in 2019. The new version launched on April 13, 2023, as an online service. The platform features Winamp Player, a music streaming service with plans to integrate with other music platforms such as Spotify and to play local audio files. Another feature of the new platform is Winamp Fanzone, where artists can upload and license their music for commercial use, and listeners can support artists directly by buying perks, such as early access to new songs or NFTs.

=== Winamp 2027 ===
Winamp will use user music libraries, and Deezer music streaming technology and global music catalog, a branded subscription music service using Deezer's white-label platform and licensed catalog, not a new Windows app release.

== Source code release ==
On May 16, 2024, Llama Group announced that Winamp would be going partially open source on September 24, 2024. The source code was released on the planned date in a GitHub repository under the "Winamp Collaborative License", a license restricting the ability to create forks or distribute modified binaries (which is not considered free or open source) and requires waiving ownership of contributions to Llama Group.

The release contained not only the intended Winamp code, but also the source code of software that it relies on, including Llama's own SHOUTcast and code from Microsoft, Dolby and Intel, many pieces of which Llama had no legal right to release. Llama initially responded by making an edit in the git repository to delete the files, but the historical editions remained available in the version history. The entire repository, including its history, was deleted on October 16, 2024.

== On other platforms ==
=== Android ===
Winamp for Android is a mobile version for the Android (version 2.1) operating system, released in beta in October 2010 with a stable release in December 2010. It includes syncing with Winamp desktop (ver. 5.59 beta+) over USB or Wi-Fi. It was received with some enthusiasm in the consumer blog press. The app was removed from the Play Store in 2014 due to a combination of factors, including a decline in user interest and the cessation of support from its parent company, AOL.

An app for the Winamp service was released in beta for Android in July 2023.

=== Macintosh ===
In 1997, Nullsoft also released MacAmp, an Apple Macintosh equivalent of Winamp.

In October 2011, Winamp Sync for Mac was introduced as a beta release. It is the first Winamp version for the Mac OS X platform and runs under version 10.6 and above. Its focus is on syncing the Winamp Library to Winamp for Android and the iTunes Music Library (hence the name, "Winamp Sync for Mac"). Nonetheless, a full Winamp Library and player features are included. The developer's blog stated that the Winamp Sync for Mac Beta would pave the way for future Winamp-related development on Mac and a fully featured media player as Winamp on Windows. However no further development occurred.

=== Linux ===
An early alpha preview of Winamp3 for desktop Linux was developed in October 2001, but support was dropped not long after. Nonetheless, some versions of Winamp for Windows are functional using Wine.

=== MS-DOS ===
DOSamp for MS-DOS operating systems was released in 1997. The software was soon abandoned by Nullsoft to focus on the Windows version (Winamp).

=== iOS ===
In July 2023, a beta version of a Winamp service was released via TestFlight for the iOS mobile platform.

== Easter eggs ==
Winamp has historically included a number of Easter eggs: hidden features that are accessible via undocumented operations. One example is an image of Justin Frankel, one of Winamp's original authors, hidden in Winamp's About dialog box. The included Easter eggs have changed with versions of Winamp, and over thirty have been documented elsewhere.

== Derivative works ==
Screenshot of a themed Webamp player

Unagi is the codename for the media playback engine derived from Winamp core technologies. AOL announced in 2004 that Unagi would be incorporated into AOL Media Player (AMP), in development. After beta testing, AMP was discontinued in 2005, but portions lived on in AOL's Web-based player.

XMMS, xmms2, qmmp and Audacious are free and open source music players created as clones of Winamp. Some of these even support skins and plug-ins designed for Winamp.

Webamp is a near-complete clone of Winamp 2.9x written in HTML5 and JavaScript. It has full support for skins and is used in the Winamp Skin Museum, a website that displays the massive collection of Winamp skins in the Internet Archive. It is also used on Internet Archive web pages.

== See also ==
- MacAmp
- XMMS
- qmmp
- foobar2000
- Audacious
- Comparisons of media players
- Comparison of audio player software
- Comparison of feed aggregators
- List of audio conversion software
