= Ogg formats in HTML5 =

Adoption of multimedia formats for the Web

The HTML5 draft specification adds video and audio elements for embedding video and audio in HTML documents. The specification had formerly recommended support for playback of Theora video and Vorbis audio encapsulated in Ogg containers to provide for easier distribution of audio and video over the internet by using open standards, but the recommendation was soon after dropped.

== Motivation ==
Because some visitors and publishers choose not to take part in the use of proprietary software, web content has been made available through open standards in order to reach these users. As multimedia is already mainstream on the web through proprietary data formats (such as Windows Media Video and MP4) and browser plugins (such as Adobe Flash Player), developers had hoped Theora and Vorbis would become part of the HTML5 specification.

Users affiliated with the free software movement claimed the following advantages:

- The potential for universal adoption of Theora and Vorbis, no matter the computer or the user, would ease "codec hell" by eliminating an unnecessary amount of codecs required to view and publish videos to a select few.
- Browser plugins needed to accommodate the many different codecs would then become a thing of the past:
  - Browsers could handle the playback of Theora and Vorbis and allow the user to customize the manner in which that was done.
  - Bugs and exploits in obsolete versions of those plugins would affect the user less, as they are phased out; the loss of multiple attack vectors would happen once browser plugins were ultimately removed.
  - The HTML5-conformant player, not having to be coded for compatibility with different browsers, could make bugs and exploits easier to find during browser development, and any exploits found would only be able to target that one browser.
- Free software encoders would compete with rival proprietary encoders, increasing encoder quality through competition.
- Embedding of multimedia by the use of clear and straightforward video and audio elements would require less effort than mastering the object element or learning ActionScript as required by Adobe Flash.

CTO at Opera Software, Håkon Wium Lie explained in a Google tech talk entitled "The <video> element" the proposal of Theora as the video format for HTML5:

I believe very strongly, that we need to agree on some kind of baseline video format if [the video element] is going to succeed. [...] We want a freely implementable open standard to hold the content we put out. That's why we developed the PNG image format. [...] PNG [...] came late to the party. Therefore I think it's important that from the beginning we think about this.

After the presentation, Lie was asked whether Opera will support other formats than Ogg:

My opinion is that browsers shouldn't support other codecs, at least not in the beginning, until we have established a baseline format. [...] We don't want to contaminate <video> with other formats.

== Support ==
Opera Software and Mozilla have been advocates for including the Ogg formats into the HTML standard. Support has been available in experimental builds of Opera 9.5 since 2007, and Ogg Theora is fully supported since Opera 10.50. Gecko 1.9.1 (browsers based on this engine include Mozilla Firefox 3.5 and SeaMonkey 2.0), released on June 30, 2009, was the first non-experimental layout engine to support Ogg formats. Google Chrome included support in their 3.0 release (September 2009), along with support for H.264. However, they did not support MPEG-1 (the parts patents on which are thought to have expired), citing concerns over performance.

Microsoft began work in October 2017 on implementing support for Ogg, Vorbis, and Theora in Windows 10 and Microsoft Edge.

In October 2023, Google announced their plans to deprecate and remove support for the Theora video codec starting with experiments reducing Theora support in Chrome 120 and a full removal in Chrome 123, Google states that the reason for the removal is due to low use and security risks associated with the codec.

== Opposition ==
On October 17, 2007, the World Wide Web Consortium encouraged interested people to take part in a "Video on the Web Workshop", held on December 12, 2007, for two days. A number of global companies were involved, submitting position papers. Among them, Nokia's paper states that "a W3C-led standardization of a 'free' codec, or the active endorsement of proprietary technology such as Ogg [...] by W3C, is, in our opinion, not helpful". Xiph.org's codecs, while licensed under a BSD-style permissive free software license, implement a standard controlled by Xiph.org themselves, rather than a multi-vendor community such as MPEG. Apple Inc., a member of the MPEG LA, has also opposed the inclusion of Ogg formats in the HTML standard on the grounds that H.264 performs better and is already more widely supported, citing patents on their codec's efficiency and the lack of precedents of "Placing requirements on format support", even at the "SHOULD" level, in HTML specifications.

== Recommendation retracted ==
On December 10, 2007, the HTML 5 specification was updated, replacing the reference to Theora and Vorbis with a placeholder:

It would be helpful for interoperability if all browsers could support the same codecs. However, there are no known codecs that satisfy all the current players: we need a codec that is known to not require per-unit or per-distributor licensing, that is compatible with the open source development model, that is of sufficient quality as to be usable, and that is not an additional submarine patent risk for large companies. This is an ongoing issue and this section will be updated once more information is available.

The removal of the Ogg formats from the specification made it completely file format neutral, like previous versions of HTML. The decision was criticized by a number of Web developers. A follow-up discussion also occurred on the W3C questions and answers blog.

In response to criticism, the WHATWG has cited concerns over the Ogg formats still being within patent lifetime and thus vulnerable to unknown patents. Such submarine patents may also exist for formats like MP3. Also, the AVC patent licensing policy is subject to change in a not-yet-clear manner.

== Adoption ==
As of December 31, 2020, Adobe Flash Player has stopped receiving support from Adobe, with HTML video being one of the main technologies replacing it.

"WebRTC Audio Codec and Processing Requirements" Internet standard drafts, published in 2011–2013, require free formats, including Opus, which was developed, among others, by programmers associated with Xiph.Org Foundation (the maintainer of Ogg).

== See also ==
- HTML video
