= Cowon Z2 Plenue =

Android-based portable media player

- Developer: Cowon Systems, Inc.
- Product family: Plenue
- Type: Portable multimedia player
- Released: January 19, 2012
- Introductory price: depending on version, from 259,000 wons to 339,000 wons (US $ 229.56 to 300.46)
- Media: Audio:. mp3, .wav, .wma (multichannel supported), .ogg, .ape, .aac, .flac (multichannel supported), multichannel and multiple audio tracks for movies: AC3 (Dolby digital multichannel up to 5.1ch@640 kbps fully supported by default player software), DTS (Digital Theatre Systems/DATASAT multichannel up to 5.1ch@1536 kbps supported by third party software - "MX Player" with custom ffdshow codecs). Video:. avi, .wmv, .asf, .mp4, .mkv, .mpg, .dat, .ts, .tp, .trp, .3gp. Can play back HD video up to 1920x1080 progressive scan outputted via micro HDMI to external display
- Operating system: Android 2.3.5 Gingerbread
- System on a chip: Telechips TCC8803
- CPU: ARM Cortex-A8 Telechips TCC8803 dual-core 1.2 GHz (underclocked to 1 GHz)
- Memory: 512 MB SDRAM
- Storage: 8, 16 or 32 GB solid-state memory; up to 128 GB transflash microSD memory card
- Display: 3.7 in (94 mm), Corning Gorilla Glass-covered 16,777,216-color (24-bit) Super AMOLED screen, 480×800 px at 252 ppi, ∞:1 contrast ratio
- Graphics: GPU: ARM Mali-200 (275 MHz, overclocked to 320 MHz); VPU: ARM Mali-VE6
- Sound: Built-in front-facing mono speaker; 3.5 mm stereo audio jack for headphones (19 mW per channel audio output)
- Input: multi-touch touchscreen display; volume buttons; playback buttons (play/pause, fast forward and rewind); microphone; 3-axis accelerometer
- Power: Built-in rechargeable lithium-ion polymer battery Music: 22 h Video: 8.5 h
- Dimensions: 116.5 mm (4.59 in) H 62.8 mm (2.47 in) W 11.8 mm (0.46 in) D
- Weight: 116 g (4.1 oz)
- Website: Product page

The Cowon Z2 Plenue is an Android-based portable media player manufactured by Cowon Systems, Inc. Its release was announced on January 19, 2012. In the year of its release, the Z2 was awarded the iF product design award.

The Z2 is widely considered to be the successor to the earlier D3 Plenue, upon which it improves in a number of ways, most notably of which is speed. The Z2 features a 1 GHz Cortex-A8 CPU and has 512 MB of RAM. Aside from the CPU, it also contains a 320 MHz Mali-200 GPU and an 800 MHz Mali-VE6 VPU.

The Z2 was received well by critics. An Engadget reviewer called it “stunningly quick”, and proceeded to state that “the touch response was just as good as on our Galaxy S II. In fact, that's indicative of the overall system.” Additionally, the Z2 has received consistently favourable reviews at online stores such as Amazon.com and Advanced MP3 Players.

The Z2 features a 3.7-inch, Gorilla Glass-covered Super AMOLED touchscreen with pixel dimensions of 480×800. It comes in black or white, with internal flash memory capacities ranging from 8 to 32 GB. Additionally, it supports external data storage via microSD transflash card up to 128 Gigabytes
