= Altacast =

Open source audio encoder

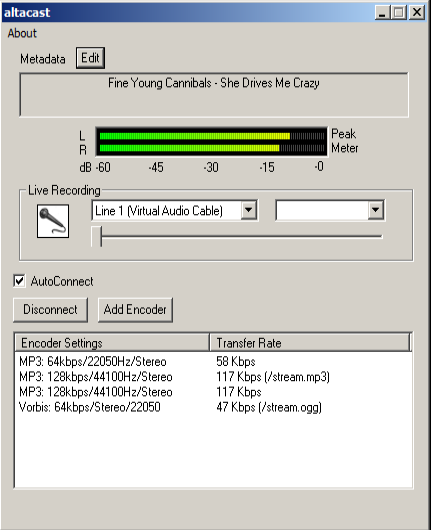
- Original author: Ed Zaleski
- Developer: Altacast.com
- Release: April 2001; 25 years ago

Stable release(s)
- Standalone, DSP: 1.0 / September 3, 2012; 14 years ago
- RadioDJ plugin: 2.5.5 / March 19, 2016; 10 years ago
- Operating system: Microsoft Windows
- Platform: IA-32, x64
- Size: 2.2 MB
- Type: Streaming media
- License: Standalone, DSP: GPL; RadioDJ plugin: Freeware
- Website: altacast.com

OddSock
- Type: Nonprofit
- Industry: Internet Radio Software
- Founded: Chicago, IL (60067)
- Headquarters: Chicago, IL, United States
- Key people: Ed Zaleski, Founder
- Number of employees: 1

Altacast (formerly known as Edcast and Oddcast) is a free and open-source audio encoder that can be used to create Internet streams of varying types. Many independent and commercial broadcasters use Altacast to create Internet radio stations, such as those listed on the Icecast, Loudcaster and Shoutcast station directories.

== Development ==
The original streaming software, Oddcast, was developed from 2000 to 2010. The official site at Oddsock.org hosted streaming media tools, which included Oddcast, Stream Transcoder, Icecast Station Browser plugin, Song Requester plugin and Do Something plugin. In late November 2010, Oddsock.org was shut down.

Edcast, a fork of Oddcast, is being updated and hosted at Club RIO. In early 2012, development of Edcast was moved to Google Code and SourceForge. As of October 30, 2011, the latest stable version is 3.33.2011.1026 and the latest beta version is 3.37.2011.1214.

In September 2012, a second fork, Altacast was released. The Standalone & DSP edition are derived from GPL software and is available on GitHub, while the RadioDJ edition is written in .NET Framework and developed separately. A version 2.0 for the Standalone & DSP edition that will be SHOUTcast v2 compatible is planned for the future.

Altacast plugin for RadioDJ will no longer function with new versions of RadioDJv2 - Altacast is not supported by the developer of RadioDJ due to legal issues.

== Features ==
Altacast is supported on Windows. It will run in conjunction with various media players compatible with Winamp plugins, such as AIMP, JetAudio, KMPlayer, MediaMonkey, MusicBee and foobar2000, as well as a standalone encoder.

Altacast Standalone & DSP can stream to Icecast and SHOUTcast servers in Ogg Vorbis and Ogg FLAC out-of-the-box. MP3, AAC and AAC+ support can be added via the LAME encoder (lame_enc.dll), FAAC encoder (libFAAC.dll), and CT-aacPlus encoder (enc_aacplus.dll obtainable from Winamp 5.61) respectively. Adjustable settings for each encoder include bitrate (for MP3, AAC+, Ogg Vorbis), quality (for AAC, Ogg Vorbis), sample rate (22050 Hz or 44100 Hz) and channels (Parametric Stereo is available for AAC+ up till 56 kbit/s).

SHOUTcast v2 is currently not officially supported in Altacast Standalone & DSP. However, it is possible to connect to stream ID no. 1 of a SHOUTcast v2 server in legacy (v1) mode. As a temporary workaround, the SHOUTcast DSP 1.9.2 plugin for Winamp-compatible media players may be used to broadcast to alternate mount points (e.g. stream ID no. 2).

SHOUTcast v2 and Opus support is available in v1.4 onwards in the plugin.

== Reception ==
In 2007 Oddcast was used in a document from the Department of Audio Communication of Technische Universität Berlin as part of description to set up an internet radio broadcast system. Use of edcast for a similar purpose was described in a 2010 article in the PCWorld magazine. A 2016 thesis for Oulu University of Applied Sciences has described the used of Altacast in the implementation of an internet radio station while the for a 2018 article in the Linux Journal recommended it as a compatible source client for Microsoft Windows in setting up a freeware internet radio station using Liquidsoap, icecast and open standards. Académie d'Orléans-Tours has used web radio (internet radio) for broadcasts for students and the use of edcast subsequently altacast in the system has been described.

== See also ==
- List of Internet radio stations
- List of streaming media systems
