= Cowon S9 =

2008 touchscreen portable media player

- Manufacturer: Cowon Systems, Inc.
- Type: Portable media player
- Released: December 8, 2008
- Storage: 4, 8, 16 and 32 GB flash memory
- Display: 3.3 in 272×480 pixels AMOLED display covered with Corning Gorilla Glass
- Input: Capacitive touchscreen display; Play/pause button; FF and REW buttons; Volume buttons; Power/hold switch
- Power: Rechargeable lithium-ion polymer battery Audio playback: 55 h Video playback: 11 h
- Dimensions: 57 mm (2.2 in) × 105.8 mm (4.17 in) × 12.7 mm (0.50 in) (W×H×D)
- Weight: 77 g (2.7 oz)

The Cowon S9 is a touchscreen portable media player released in late 2008 by Cowon Systems, Inc. It features support for audio file formats such as MP3, Ogg Vorbis and FLAC, and video formats such as DivX and Xvid.

== Specifications ==
Current firmware version	2.53
Display	type: AMOLED
Display	size: 3.3 in (84 mm)
Display	aspect ratio: 16:9 aspect ratio
Display	colour depth: 24-bit (16 million colours)
Display	pixel dimensions: 480×272
Display	touchscreen type: capacitive
System on chip	Telechips TCC7901
CPU core	Dual 500 MHz ARM ARM926EJ-S
Digital-to-analogue converter	Wolfson Microelectronics WM8750S
Max output	29 mW (under a load of 16 ohm)
Signal-to-noise ratio	95 dB
Materials	Plastic, Corning Gorilla Glass
Colour	‘Chrome Black’, ‘Titanium Black’ or ‘Ceramic White’
Power	Built-in rechargeable lithium-ion polymer battery
Rated battery life (hours)	audio: 55 video: 11
Storage	4, 8, 16 or 32 GB flash memory (FAT32 file system)
Connectivity	USB 2.0; Bluetooth 2.0 + EDR (A2DP and AVRCP); Microphone; FM radio Composite video
Container support	audio: APE, FLAC, MP3, Ogg, WAV, WMA
Container support	video: ASF, AVI, WMV
Container support	pictures: JPEG
Container support	text: TXT
Codec support	audio: APE, MPEG-1 Audio Layer III, MPEG-2 Audio Layer III, MPEG-2.5 Audio Layer III, FLAC, Ogg, RIFF (LPCM), WAV, WMA
Codec support	video:
