= Squish =

Squish may refer to:

- Squish (FidoNet), a mail tossing application and mail storage format.
- Ogg Squish, an audio compression codec.
- Squish (piston engine), an effect in internal combustion engines, creating additional turbulence as the piston reaches top-dead centre.
- Squish (Froglogic), a commercial computer program to test graphical user interfaces.
- Squish (TV series) A French animated series based on the graphic novel created by Jennifer Holm & Matthew Holm
- Squish, a slang for a platonic crush.
