= Oddcast =

Oddcast may refer to:

- Oddcast (company), a New York City-based developer and provider of the SitePal service
- Edcast or Oddcast, an open-source audio encoder
