= Encipher Inye =

The Encipher Inye is a tablet PC developed by The Encipher Group. It was announced on 8 May 2010 and released in Nigeria that same year. It is powered by a Telechips Tcc8902 ARM 11 800 MHz processor and runs on Android version 2.1 (Eclair). It was created by Saheed Adepoju, one of the co-founders.

== Specifications ==
Power: 2,600 mAh battery

Storage capacity: 16 GB

Memory: 512 MB

Input: Resistive touchscreen

I/O PORTS: Mic- in, DC-in, 35 mm stereo headphone jack, HDMI 1.3, output 1080p 1 x USB Host 1.1, high-speed USB OTG 2.0.

Camera: 1.3 MP

AUDIO: MP3, WMA, MP2, OGG, AAC, M4A, MA4, FLAC, APE, 3GP, and WAV

Video playback: Capable of HD playback (1080p)

Connectivity: Wi-Fi 802.11 (a/b/g). 3G.

Online services: Android Market

== Name ==
The name "Inye" means 'The One' in Igala, a language in Nigeria.

== See also ==
Android
