= Chris Montgomery =

American programmer (born 1972)

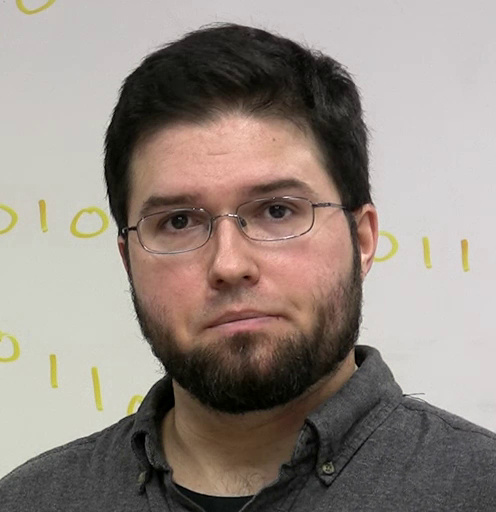
Christopher Montgomery (2010).

Christopher "Monty" Montgomery (born June 6, 1972) is an American programmer and engineer. He is the original creator of the Ogg Free Software container format and the Vorbis audio codec and others, and the founder of The Xiph.Org Foundation, which promotes public domain multimedia codecs. He uses xiphmont as an online pseudonym.

He holds a B.S. in electrical engineering and computer science from the Massachusetts Institute of Technology and a M.Eng. degree in computer engineering from the Tokyo Institute of Technology.

A multimedia programmer, free software advocate and musician, Monty resides in the Boston area. He previously worked for Red Hat on improving the quality of the Ogg Theora format and decoders. In October 2013, he announced his almost immediate switch to Mozilla. Work on Daala will be an important part of his work there.

Montgomery was the evening keynote at the Ohio LinuxFest in September 2010.
