= Samsung Pebble =

Portable media player

- Developer: Samsung
- Type: MP3/Ogg Audio Player
- Dimensions: 44 X 43 X 18 mm (0.090 X 0.095 X 0.040 lb) (H x W x D)
- Weight: 227 grams (0.500 lb)

The Samsung Pebble is a small MP3/Ogg audio player shaped like a flat, round pebble.

Featuring no screen, the Pebble is meant to be worn around the neck like a pendant. It has features such as on-the-go and sound effects buttons on the side. The Pebble comes in 1 GB, 2 GB or 4 GB. It also features a shuffle feature similar to the iPod. The Pebble was released in 2012.
