= Xiph.Org Foundation =

Nonprofit multimedia format organization

- Founded: 1994; 32 years ago
- Founder: Christopher Montgomery
- Type: 501(c)(3)
- Location: Somerville, Massachusetts, U.S.
- Region served: Worldwide
- Products: Free multimedia formats, libraries, and streaming software
- Key people: Christopher Montgomery, Jack Moffitt, Ralph Giles (Theora), Jean-Marc Valin (Speex, CELT, Opus), Josh Coalson (FLAC), Michael Smith, Timothy B. Terriberry
- Website: xiph.org

The Xiph.Org Foundation is a nonprofit organization that produces free multimedia formats and software tools. It focuses on the Ogg family of formats, the most successful of which has been Vorbis, an open and freely licensed audio format and codec designed to compete with the patented WMA, MP3 and AAC. As of 2013, development work was focused on Daala, an open and patent-free video format and codec designed to compete with VP9 and the patented High Efficiency Video Coding.

In addition to its in-house development work, the foundation has also brought several already-existing but complementary free software projects under its aegis, most of which have a separate, active group of developers. These include Speex, an audio codec designed for speech, and FLAC, a lossless audio codec.

The Xiph.Org Foundation has criticized Microsoft and the RIAA for their lack of openness. They state that if companies like Microsoft had owned patents on the Internet, then other companies would have tried to compete, and "The Net, as designed by warring corporate entities, would be a battleground of incompatible and expensive 'standards' had it actually survived at all." They also criticize the RIAA for their support of projects such as the Secure Digital Music Initiative.

In 2008, the Free Software Foundation listed the Xiph.Org projects as High Priority Free Software Projects.

== History ==
Chris Montgomery, creator of the Ogg container format, founded the Xiphophorus company and later the Xiph.Org Foundation. The first work that became the Ogg media projects started in 1994. The name "Xiph" abbreviates the original organizational name, "Xiphophorus", named after the common swordtail fish, Xiphophorus hellerii. It was officially incorporated on 15 May 1996 as Xiphophorus, Inc. The name "Xiphophorus company" was used until 2002, when it was renamed to Xiph.Org Foundation.

In 1999, the Xiphophorus company defined itself on its website as "a distributed group of Free and Open Source programmers working to protect the foundations of Internet multimedia from domination by self-serving corporate interests."

In 2002, the Xiph.Org Foundation defined itself on its website as "a non-profit corporation dedicated to protecting the foundations of Internet multimedia from control by private interests."

In March 2003, the Xiph.Org Foundation was recognized by the IRS as a 501(c)(3) Non-Profit Organization, which means that U.S. citizens can deduct donations made to Xiph.Org from their taxes.

== Xiph.Org Foundation projects ==
- Ogg – a multimedia container format, a reference implementation, and the native file and stream format for the Xiph.org multimedia codecs
  - Vorbis – a lossy audio compression format and codec
  - Theora – a lossy video coding format and codec
  - FLAC – a lossless audio compression format and software
  - Speex – a lossy speech encoding format and software (deprecated)
  - CELT – an ultra-low delay lossy audio compression format that has been merged into Opus, and is now obsolete
  - Opus – a low delay lossy audio compression format originally intended for VoIP
  - Tremor – an integer-only implementation of the Vorbis audio decoder for embedded devices (software)
  - OggPCM – an encapsulation of PCM audio data inside the Ogg container format
  - Skeleton – a structuring information for multi-track Ogg files (a logical bitstream within an Ogg stream)
  - RTP payloads – containers for Vorbis, Theora, Speex and Opus.
  - CMML – an XML-based markup language for time-continuous data (a timed text codec; deprecated)
  - Ogg Squish – a lossless audio compression format and software (discontinued)
  - Tarkin – an experimental lossy video coding format; no stable release (discontinued)
  - Daala – a video coding format and codec
  - Kate – an overlay codec that can carry animated text and images.
- libao – an audio-output library that operates on different platforms
- Annodex – an encapsulation format, which interleaves time-continuous data with CMML markup in a streamable manner
- Icecast – an open source multi-platform streaming server (software)
- Ices – a source client for broadcasting in Ogg Vorbis or MP3 format to an icecast2 server (software)
- IceShare – an unfinished peercasting system for Ogg multimedia (no longer maintained)
- cdparanoia – an open source CD Audio extraction tool that aims to be bit-perfect (currently unmaintained)
- XSPF – an XML Shareable Playlist Format

=== OpenCodecs ===
OpenCodecs is a software package for Windows adding DirectShow filters for the Theora and WebM codecs. It adds Theora and WebM support to Windows Media Player and enables HTML video in Internet Explorer. It consists of:

- dshow, Xiph's DirectShow filters for their suite of Ogg formats, including Theora and Vorbis
- webmdshow, the DirectShow filter for WebM maintained by the WebM project
- An ActiveX plugin adding HTML video capability to Internet Explorer older than version 9

=== QuickTime Components ===
Xiph QuickTime Components are implementations of the Ogg container along with the Speex, Theora, FLAC and Vorbis codecs for QuickTime. It allows users to use Ogg files in any application that uses QuickTime for audio and video file support, such as iTunes and QuickTime Player.

Since QuickTime Components do not function in macOS Sierra and above, the project was discontinued in 2016.
