= IAUDIO =

Portable media player brand

The iAUDIO logo

iAUDIO is a brand of portable media players produced by Korean consumer electronics and software corporation Cowon Systems, Inc.

== Products ==
The iAUDIO range consists of players based on both flash memory and hard disk drives. Flash memory-based players are available with a capacity of up to 32 GB, while the hard drive-based models currently have capacities up to 160 GB. The iAUDIO 6 was the first player to use Toshiba's new 4GB 0.85″ hard disk.

=== iAUDIO M3 ===
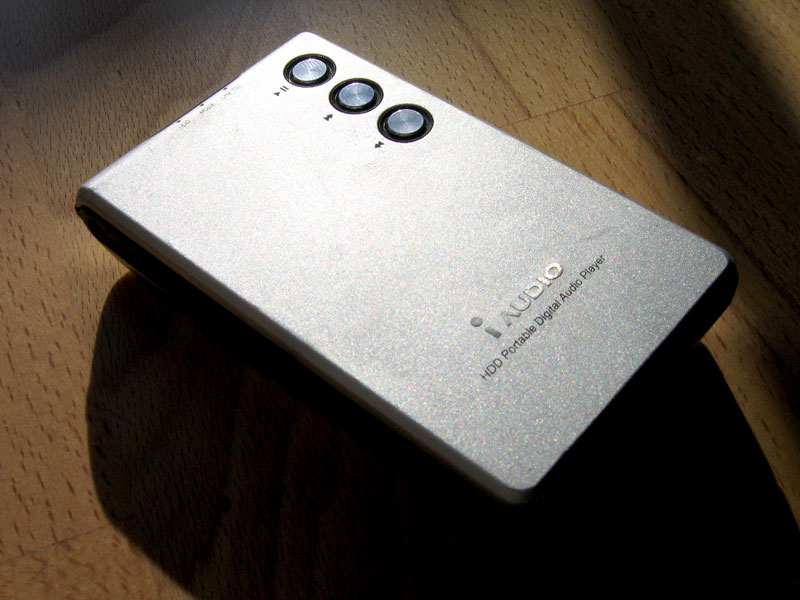
iAUDIO M3

The iAUDIO M3 was introduced March 2004. The player was Cowon's first DAP with an integrated 1.8-inch (46 mm) hard drive. The iAUDIO M3 is completely format-agnostic, enabling the industry-standard 'direct encoding.' WMA, OGG, ASF, WAV, and MP3 music files can be transferred between PCs and Macs using USB 2.0 or direct input. The device has a 20GB storage. When the M3 was released there was a lot of controversy about it, because the actual unit had no display. All but a few basic functions had to be controlled via the included remote control. Some people liked this concept, others were not so fond of it.

When the iAUDIO M3 was first released outside of Korea, there was a quality issue with the player's remote control. There was a widespread "fading" issue, in which the text of the remote slowly disappeared. This issue was rectified by the rapid recall of all faulty remotes and free replacements.

=== iAUDIO U2 ===
The iAUDIO U2 was introduced in July 2004. It was also Cowon's first player to feature a navigational joystick instead of the 2 rockers found on most previous releases. The U2 used the STMP 3520 chipset by Sigmatel. It comes in the colours of Ruby Red (256MB of memory), Ocean Blue (512MB of memory), and Black (2GB of memory). The iAudio U2 has rounded corners and delicately woven silver ring ringing the five-way navigational button. The U2 is smaller and lighter than the iAudio 4, measuring at 2.9x1.0x0.7 inches and weighing 1.2 ounces, and features a 128x64-pixel display. The U2's built-in lithium-polymer battery lasted 15 hours. The USB 2.0 transfer rate is at 1.86MB per second.

=== iAUDIO 5 ===
The iAUDIO 5 was introduced in November 2004. It was the successor to the popular iAUDIO 4 series and was powered by the same Sigmatel chipset that were used in the iAUDIO U2 and G3. The iAUDIO 5 was relatively similar to the aforementioned players. What set it apart from other players was that it had 1000 different backlight colour combinations. It was powered by an AAA battery which allowed for a maximum playback time of up to 20 hours.The device's colour is determined by the memory size; the 256MB model has red accents, the 512MB model has blue accents, and the 1GB and 2GB units have black accents. It has a size of 3 by 1.4 by 0.7 inches and weighs around 1 ounce.

=== iAUDIO X5 ===
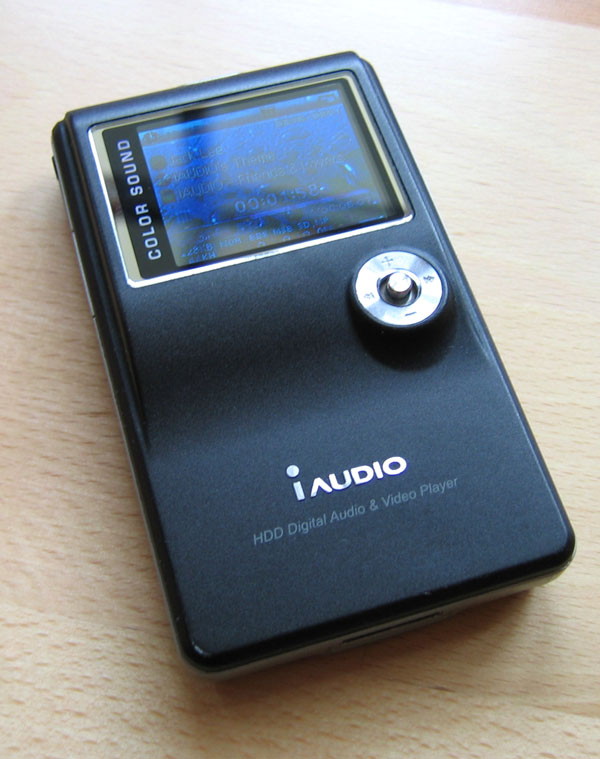
iAUDIO X5

The iAUDIO X5 was released in April 2005.

The X5 uses much of the same hardware as the M3, and as such has much of the same features and capabilities. It has almost identical features to the iriver H300 Series. The X5 includes a color screen on the unit.

As with the M3, there is an "L" version which is 4 mm thicker and has a longer battery life. Unlike the M3, the X5 comes in 20, 30, and 60 GB variants. It is likely that there will be no 60 GB X5L, as the 60 GB X5 itself is the thickness of the 20 and 30 GB X5L due to the increased size of the hard drive. The 20, 30, and 60 GB capacities offer a rated battery life of 14 hours for audio playback with a 950 mAh battery. The 20 and 30 GB X5L models specify a rated playback time of 35 hours with a 2250 mAh battery. Video battery life is unspecified. In addition to the "L" versions, the X5 also comes in a "V" variation, which lacks the FM radio.

Cowon announced in May 2007 that the X5 series had been discontinued. Its successor, the X7 series, was slated to be released at some point in the summer of 2007, but was delayed until October 2010.

=== iAUDIO U3 ===
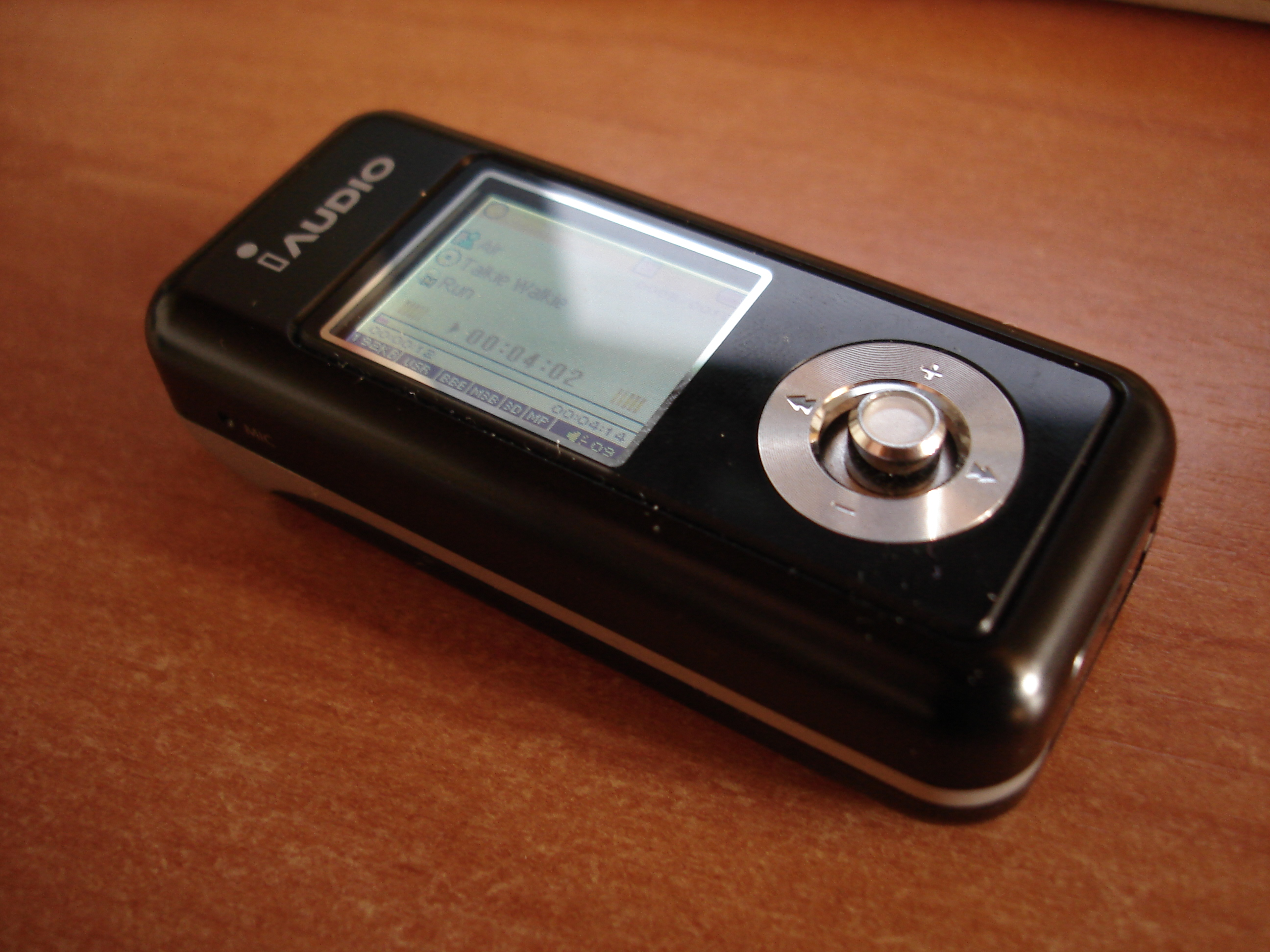
iAUDIO U3

Introduced in October 2005, the iAUDIO U3 was the successor to the iAUDIO U2. The main difference between the two players was that the U3 featured a color screen (260,000 colors, 160×128 resolution) which allowed playback of MPEG4 videos encoded in XviD, as well as picture display. Like the iAUDIO X5, the U3 only played video files at up to 15 frame/s with a resolution of 160x128. Most videos must therefore be converted to be played back on the U3 using the provided software from Cowon. The player can also display JPEG and TXT files. The support for audio files was also enhanced from previous models: the U3 was the world's first Flash-based player that was able to play FLAC files (but only from compression rate 0 to 2 with the initial Firmware v1.11. It now supports up to Q8 with V1.13). Another new feature was the U3's powerful sound output of 30 mW per channel (at 16 ohm, achieved by utilizing the new Telechip TCC770 audio chipset and Cirrus Logic CS42L51 Codec). Like the U2 the U3 had a built-in lithium polymer cell for a playback time of up to 20 hours. As with all iAUDIO devices, there was no need for the use of software, since the U3 was a UMS device (though additional software was required to take advantage of some features, such as converting video to the right format to be played back on the player).

With the firmware version 1.20 Cowon added ID3 browsing and DRM capabilities to the U3. This made the U3 the first iAUDIO player that allowed the user to browse its contents by the contents of ID3 tags embedded in the files.

Features:

- 512 MB/1 GB/2 GB/4 GB of flash memory
- 260,000 color TFT LCD screen, with a resolution of 160×128
- Support for MP3, WMA, ASF, WAV, Vorbis, FLAC, and MPEG4 (video)files
- Support for recording in WMA format at 32, 64, 80, 96, and 128 kbit/s
- USB 2.0
- FM radio
- Line in recording
- Voice recording via built-in microphone or an external microphone
- FM radio recording

=== iAUDIO T2 ===
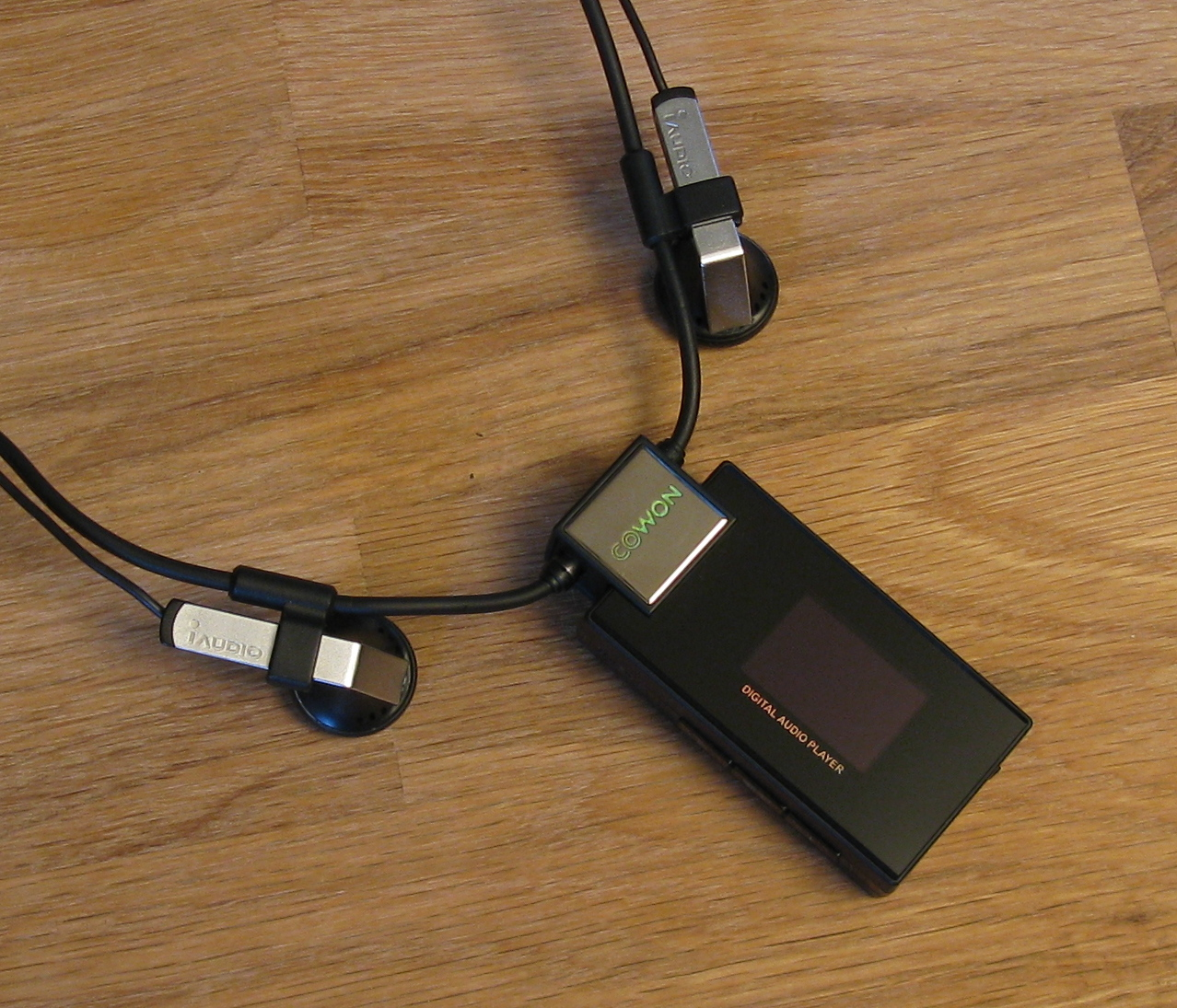
iAUDIO T2

In August 2006, Cowon released the iAUDIO T2. The T2 was a necklace type audio player. It featured a color screen, though it did not support video or photo viewing. Features included FM radio, voice recording and Cowon's traditional wide codec support: the T2 supported MP3, WMA, Ogg, and WAV audio files.

FLAC was supported up to firmware 1.20, but not by later versions. Firmware 1.20 is no longer available for download from Cowon.

=== iAUDIO F2 ===
In September 2006, Cowon System Inc. released the iAUDIO F2. The F2, with a design similar to a mobile phone, was the successor to the F1, and very similar to the U3 in features. Instead of the F1's OLED display, it featured a color LCD. The iAudio F2 has a 1.3-inch display with 128x160 pixels, up to 2 GB of flash memory, line-in recording, 22 hours of audio playback on a single charge, and the usual Cowon supported codecs: MP3, WMA, WAV, OGG Vorbis, and even FLAC for lossless audiophiles. Apart from FM radio, voice recording and line-in recording, it also featured video playback as well as photo and text viewing. The interface symbols indicate that it has an inbuilt FM radio and voice recorder. This 2-gigabyte device weighs 39 grammes and measures 34.4 x 72.9 x 16.7 mm.

=== iAUDIO E2 ===
In November 2009, the iAUDIO E2 was released. The iAudio E2 has no screen which means it fully operates four buttons, two on each side, and voice cues. The button location is at the same place on both sides of the device. The volume fluctuates in minuscule increments. The 2GB memory may be filled with songs to play in order or shuffle; it supports AAC, FLAC, MP3, OGG, and WAV files and can play for up to 11 hours on a single charge.

=== iAUDIO 9+ ===
In July 2013, the iAUDIO 9+ was released. The unit has exactly the same physical and technical specifications as the original iAUDIO 9, except for a slightly larger internal speaker and JetEffect v. 5.0 (the original iAUDIO 9 was released with JetEffect v. 3.0). The Cowon iAUDIO 9+ comes in three capacities (and two colours): 8GB (white), 16GB (black), and 32GB (black). It has a 2-inch QVGA (320 x 240-pixel) display positioned atop a capacitive touchpad. It includes a 30mW headphone amplifier, video connectivity (through an extra cable), a microphone, and an FM radio (to record voice and broadcasts). The device is 40g in weight and is 95 x 43 x 8.9mm (3.74 x 1.69 x 0.35 inches) in size. It also supports a variety of audio formats (including rarities like FLAC and OGG) and USB mass storage.

=== iAUDIO 9 ===
In November 2009, the Cowon iAUDIO 9 was released, more than two years after its predecessor, the i7. iAudio 9 has a 43mm x 95mm x 8.6mm dimension, a weight of 40g, menu button and volume buttons on either side of the player, 8/16GB of memory, music and videos found on FM radio. It features a new vertical form factor and improves upon its predecessor by the inclusion of a built-in speaker. The iAdudio 9 also supports files including MP3, WMA, FLAC and WAV files, as well as WMV and AVI videos. The iAudio 9 is a little larger and heavier than the iAudio 8.

== Sound enhancements ==
All Cowon media players, starting with the iAUDIO 4, feature a set of sound enhancement technologies collectively referred to as JetEffect, including a technology known as BBE+, licensed from BBE Sound, Inc. The distinction between JetEffect and BBE+ is not always clear.

On Cowon media players, the JetEffect menu offers the following options:

- A five-band semi-parametric equalizer
- A “BBE+” menu with adjustable settings for “BBE+” (presumably a modified implementation of what BBE calls “process” in its Sonic Maximizers), “Mach3Bass”, “3D Surround” and “MP Enhance” (the latter is described in detail here)
- A “Special Effects” menu with options for stereo enhancement and reverb algorithms

The latest version of JetEffect, JetEffect 5, was introduced with the January 19, 2012 release of the Cowon Z2 Plenue. It included an updated reverb algorithm, allowing the user to choose between nine different types of reverb timbres, including Chamber, Room, Club, Hall, Auditorium, Cathedral, Stadium, Canyon and Long.

All Cowon players following the D2+ (S9 and onwards) come with an updated version of BBE called BBE+.

== See also ==
- Cowon
- List of Cowon products
- JetEffect
