= Moozone =

Moozone.com was a cloud-based online music storage (aka digital locker) service and digital music store. It was owned by Multimedia Online Services, Inc. The beta version of the web site was launched in September 2009. At the moment of the launch the service had over 6 million indie tracks on sale in Mp3 (320 kbit/s) format. It is now closed.

== Features and restrictions ==
=== Online Music Storage ===
The online music storage provided native support for Mp3, M4a, and Ogg formats. There were no restrictions on the content uploaded. Files can be uploaded from any computer (browser) or supported smartphone. By default each user's digital locker was limited to 2 GB. Additional storage can be purchased or rented.

=== Access from a 3G enabled device ===
In January 2010, an Android application was released. The application allowed users to stream, upload, and download their music files from and to their phones. On May 17, 2010, the application was downloaded over 10000 times. The application was also available for Android tablets.

=== Online Store ===
The online store had over 10 million indie tracks on sale in mp3 format (320 kbit/s), which were offered through a partnership with MediaNet. The site offered 30 second previews for each track in the catalog. Each track purchased was copied into user's personal digital locker, which could later be downloaded or streamed.
