= Ariel Ameijenda =

Uruguayan luthier, musician and professor

- Born: Ariel Ameijenda; 1963 (age 62–63); Montevideo, Uruguay
- Education: University of the Republic
- Occupations: luthier, musician, professor
- Children: 1
- Father: Manuel Ameijenda
- Website: Ariel Ameijenda

Ariel Ameijenda (born 1963 in Montevideo) is a luthier, musician and professor from Uruguay.

Ameijenda was born in Montevideo, Uruguay. He learned the trade of his father, Manuel, and became a luthier.

He studied at the School of Music of the Universidad de la República (University of the Republic).

In 1986, he designed the electroacoustic stringed instrument, the sitarel.

At present he makes acoustic and Spanish guitars, and repairs violins and other string instruments, in his workshop in the location of Playa Hermosa, Maldonado, Uruguay, on the slopes of the Cerro de los Burros.

In 2016 he built an eight string acoustic guitar for the Uruguayan musician Gustavo Ripa.

== Discography ==
Year	Title	Sello	others
2000	Ofrenda	NIRMALAM Music	CD con el percusionista Nicolás Arnicho, (en formato ogg).
