= S9 =

S9 may refer to:

== Transportation ==
- SIAI S.9, a 1918 Italian flying boat
- Aircraft registration prefix of São Tomé and Príncipe
- USS S-9 (SS-114), a 1920 S-class submarine of the United States Navy
- County Route S9 (California)
- Rans S-9 Chaos, a light aerobatic aircraft
- East African Safari Air's IATA code

=== Rail ===
- S9 (Berlin), an S-Bahn line in Germany
- S9 (Milan suburban railway service) in Italy
- S9 (RER Vaud), an S-Bahn line in Switzerland
- S9 (Rhine-Ruhr S-Bahn) line in Germany
- S9 (Rhine-Main S-Bahn) line in Germany
- S9 (St. Gallen S-Bahn), a line in the canton of St. Gallen, Switzerland
- S9 (ZVV), a Zurich S-Bahn line in the cantons of Zurich and Schaffhausen, Switzerland
- S9, a Basel S-Bahn line in the cantons of Basel-Landschaft and Solothurn, Switzerland
- S9, a Karlsruhe Stadtbahn line, Germany
- S9, a Lucerne S-Bahn line in the cantons of Aargau and Lucerne, Switzerland
- S9, a Styria S-Bahn line in Austria
- Line S9 (Nanjing Metro), China
- Prussian S 9, a 1908 German steam-locomotive class
- Sri Lanka Railways S9, a diesel multiple-unit train

== Other uses ==
- Samsung Galaxy S9, a smartphone by Samsung
- Samsung Galaxy Tab S9, a series of high-end Android tablets by Samsung
- S9 (classification), a disability swimming classification
- S 9 (Abydos), an Ancient Egyptian tomb in Abydos, possibly that of pharaoh Neferhotep I
- S9: Keep container in a well-ventilated place, a safety protocol
- S9 fraction, a postmitochondrial liver fraction
- Cowon S9, a portable media player
- British NVC community S9, a swamps and tall-herb fens community in the British National Vegetation Classification system
- Motorola S9, a Motorola product
- S9, a district of the S postcode area in Sheffield, England
- S9, a termination record in Motorola's SREC (file format)
- S_{9}, an allotrope of sulfur

== See also ==
- S09, a quantum key distribution protocol
- HMS Oberon (S09), a 1961 British Royal Navy Oberon-class submarine
- Brave Fire S09, an Osamu Tezuka anime
- 9S (disambiguation)
