= Vocalina =

- Vocalina interface
- Developer: TGENS
- Initial release: October 2011; 14 years ago
- Stable release: 2.3 / 1 January 2016
- Available in: Korean
- Type: Vocal Synthesizer Application
- License: Proprietary/Freeware
- Website: www.vocalina.com

VOCALINA (보카리나) is a "text to speech" vocal synthesizer, it was the first music speech synthesis technology (Singing TTS Technology) to be developed focus on the Korean language and is focused on singing. It is designed to be easy to use and produce high quality singing results.

== Overview ==
It is in the Korean language, and has similar functions to that of the Vocaloid synthesis engine. Using the editor users can alter a vocals height (Pitch), dynamics (Dynamics), Vibe ration (Vibration), Reverb (REV), and Echo (ECO) for better results. Since it is a Studio, one is able to mix the vocals right away, importing of the BGM is possible.

It was last updated in September, 2013 to version 2.2.0. It added new functions such as enhanced abilities of equalization and the ability to use VST plug-in, the track mixer was also improved. General quality was improved and grating sounds were removed, the overall master sound was improved greatly while editing and performance was enhanced. A new lyrics finder and short cut was added and support for vorbis ogg files was introduced.

On 1 January 2016, it updated to 2.3 adding new functions.

Vocalina's service was said to be terminated on 1 October 2017. The deadline has currently been extended for 1 more year and the service will end on 1 October 2018 instead, with Vocalina being a free service until then.

== Products ==
- Bora Choi (최보라) (known by her stage name VORA (보라)) was the first VOCALINA vocal, can be used for free in VOCALINA Studio, no purchase necessary. Due to quality issues, she was retired for the 2.3.0 version.
- Khylin (카일린) is the second VOCALINA voice. Unlike the previous vocal, she is not free and users must purchase a ticket which lasts a year.
