= Icecast =

Streaming media server

- Developer: Xiph.Org Foundation
- Release: 1999; 27 years ago
- Stable release: 2.5.0 / 31 December 2025
- Written in: C
- Operating system: Unix-like and Microsoft Windows
- Type: streaming media server
- License: GPL-2.0-only
- Website: icecast.org
- Repository: gitlab.xiph.org/xiph/icecast-server

Icecast is a streaming media project released as free software maintained by the Xiph.Org Foundation. It also refers specifically to the server program which is part of the project. Icecast was created in December 1998/January 1999 by Jack Moffitt and Barath Raghavan to provide an open-source audio streaming server that anyone could modify, use, and tinker with. Version 2, a ground-up rewrite aimed at multi-format support (initially targeting Ogg Vorbis) and scalability, was started in 2001 and released in January 2004.

== History ==
Icecast was originally developed by Moffitt in 1998 for SMU's radio station. At the time, the station was constantly losing its FCC license and was at the time only able to reach listeners in the same building. Given that all of the dorms throughout campus had Ethernet connectivity, using streaming audio to broadcast was a natural solution, but currently available audio streaming software, such as RealAudio, was too expensive. Moffitt created Icecast, allowing the station to easily reach everywhere on campus without the necessity of FCC licensing or a transmitter upgrade. Initially developed to support mp3 files, Vorbis support was added shortly after.

== Technical details ==
The Icecast server is capable of streaming audio content as Opus or Vorbis over standard HTTP, video as WebM or Theora over HTTP, and MP3, AAC, and NSV over the SHOUTcast protocol. Theora, AAC, and NSV are only supported in version 2.2.0 and newer.

Icecast requires external programs, called "source clients", to originate the streams, and the Icecast project includes a source client program known as IceS. The source runs typically in the place where the audio is generated (e.g., a studio) and the Icecast server where a high-bandwidth connection is available (e.g., a colocation center). Since version 2.4.0 source clients can use plain HTTP standard PUT requests instead of the custom SOURCE method.

== Supported file formats ==
Source clients	Input formats						Output formats							
Source clients	MP3	AAC	Ogg Vorbis	Ogg Opus	FLAC	WAV	MP3	AAC/AAC+	Ogg Vorbis	Ogg Opus	Ogg FLAC	NSV video	Ogg Theora video	WebM video
IceS 0.4	Yes	No	Yes	No	No	No	Yes	No	No	No	No	No	No	No
IceS 2.0	No	No	Yes	No	No	No	No	No	Yes	No	No	No	Yes	No
Liquidsoap	Yes	Yes	Yes	Yes	Yes	Yes	Yes	Yes	Yes	Yes	Yes	No	Yes	Yes
Live DSP Input	—N/a	—N/a	—N/a	—N/a	—N/a	—N/a	Yes	Yes	Yes	Yes	Yes	Yes	Yes	Yes
Rocket Broadcaster Pro	—N/a	—N/a	—N/a	—N/a	—N/a	—N/a	Yes	Yes	Yes	Yes	Yes	No	No	No
Broadcast Using This Tool	—N/a	—N/a	—N/a	—N/a	—N/a	—N/a	Yes	Yes	Yes	Yes	Yes	No	No	No
BUTTM	—N/a	—N/a	—N/a	—N/a	—N/a	—N/a	Yes	Yes	No	Yes	Yes	No	No	No
iziCast	Yes	Yes	No	No	No	Yes	Yes	Yes	Yes	No	Yes	No	No	No
Cool Mic	Yes	Yes	Yes	Yes	No	Yes	No	No	Yes	Yes	No	No	No	No

== See also ==
- List of streaming media systems
- SHOUTcast
- Peercasting
- Edcast
