= Ogg Squish =

Early name for the Ogg project

OggSquish is one of the first names used for the Ogg project developed from 1994 by the Xiphophorus company (now Xiph.Org Foundation). Ogg Squish was also an attempt from the Xiphophorus company to create a royalty-free lossless audio compression codec.

== History ==
The Ogg project began with a simple audio compression package as part of a larger project in 1993. The original name of the software was Squish, but due to an existing trademark it was later renamed to OggSquish. This name was later used for the whole Ogg project. In 1997, the Xiphophorus OggSquish was described as "an attempt both to create a flexible compressed audio format for modern audio applications as well as to provide the first audio format that is common on any and every modern computer platform".

In 1998, after Fraunhofer Society Integrated Circuits Institute intended to sue MPEG-1 Audio Layer 3 development projects because of license issues, the Xiphophorus company's focus was moved to a royalty-free lossy audio compression codec, named OggSquish Vorbis, or only "Ogg Vorbis" or "Vorbis".

In 2000, the OggSquish was referred to as "a group of several related multimedia and signal processing projects". In 2000, two projects were in active development for planned release: Ogg Vorbis format and libvorbis - the reference implementation of Vorbis. Research also included work on future video and lossless audio coding.

In 2001, OggSquish was renamed to "Ogg" and it was described as "the umbrella for a group of several related multimedia and signal processing projects".

Ogg has come to stand for the container file format, as part of the larger Xiph.org multimedia project. Squish became just the name of one of the Ogg codecs. In 2000 and 2001 there was some information from Xiphophorus company's developers about plans for a continuation of Ogg Squish as a lossless audio compression.

On January 29, 2003, the Xiph.Org Foundation officially announced the incorporation of FLAC as a lossless audio compression codec under Xiph.org banner. Ogg Squish is no longer maintained.
