= Tremor (software) =

Tremor is a fixed-point implementation of the Vorbis audio decoder developed by the Xiph.Org Foundation. It is designed for platforms that lack floating-point arithmetic support, particularly embedded systems. Unlike the standard libvorbis decoder, which uses floating-point arithmetic, Tremor uses fixed-point arithmetic to decode Vorbis audio streams.

It is a software library that decodes the Vorbis audio format. Tremor uses fixed-point and movable-point arithmetic numeric representations in its implementation so that it can be used by small embedded devices, which typically do not have floating-point processors. Thus, Tremor enables small embedded devices to play audio files stored in the Vorbis format.

Tremor was originally developed by Xiph.Org as a part of a contract for the Iomega HipZip,but was since opened up to encourage wider use of the Vorbis format. Almost all hardware devices that can play Vorbis, and many software implementations on embedded devices (such as mobile phones) use Tremor or some descendant.

It is free software released under the New BSD license.

== Technical Implementation ==
Tremor uses fixed-point arithmetic to implement Vorbis audio decoding on processors without floating-point hardware. Its main development branch includes optimizations for ARM processors and is designed to operate on embedded devices with limited computational resources. The project also provides a low-memory branch intended for systems with particularly restricted memory availability, including certain digital signal processors. The memory requirements depend on the Vorbis stream being decoded. The Tremor documentation indicates that typical files require several hundred kilobytes of memory in the main branch, while the low-memory branch uses somewhat less memory at the cost of potentially slower decoding. Texas Instruments has also documented Tremor as an integer-arithmetic reference decoder for embedded implementations of the Vorbis audio compression format.
