= Cowon D2 =

Portable media player by Cowon Systems

- Manufacturer: Cowon Systems, Inc.
- Type: Portable media player
- Released: December 5, 2006 (D2); February 23, 2009 (D2+)
- Storage: 2, 4, 8 and 16 GB flash memory
- Display: 2.5 in 320×240 pixels TFT LCD
- Input: Touchscreen display; Volume buttons; Menu button; Power/hold slider
- Power: Rechargeable lithium-ion polymer battery, 1600 mAh; Audio playback: 52 h Video playback: 10 h
- Dimensions: 78 mm (3.1 in) × 55.4 mm (2.18 in) × 16.6 mm (0.65 in) (W×H×D)
- Weight: 91 g (3.2 oz)

The Cowon D2 is a portable media player designed and marketed by Cowon. The D2, released in December 2006, was Cowon's first portable media player using a touchscreen as the main means of navigation. It has since been discontinued.

== Specifications ==
Current firmware version	2.59; 4.59 (DAB version)
Display	2.6 in (66 mm); 4:3 aspect ratio; 24-bit colour depth, 320×240 px (QVGA) TFT LCD
System on chip	Telechips TCC7801
CPU core	ARM ARM926EJ-S
Storage	2, 4, 8 and 16 GB NAND flash memory
Memory	32 MB
File format support	audio: MP3, APE, FLAC, Ogg, WAV, WMA
File format support	video: DivX, Xvid, WMV
File format support	pictures: JPEG, BMP
File format support	text: TXT
Connectivity	USB 2.0; Microphone
Digital-to-analogue converter	Wolfson Microelectronics WM8985
Signal-to-noise ratio	95 dB
Materials	Plastic, metal
Colour	Black or white
Power	Built-in rechargeable lithium-ion polymer battery, 1600 mAh
Rated battery life (hours)	audio: 52 video: 10
Dimensions	78 mm (3.1 in) × 55.4 mm (2.18 in) × 16.6 mm (0.65 in)
Weight	91 g (3.2 oz)

Other features include Flash Lite, a text viewer, a painting app, voice recording, FM radio with recording, TV-out, optional DMB and DAB compatibility, and an SDHC card slot.

== D2+ ==
In February 2009, Cowon released the D2+, an updated version of the D2 that was "nearly indistinguishable" from the original version.
