= Jack Moffitt (computer scientist) =

American computer scientist

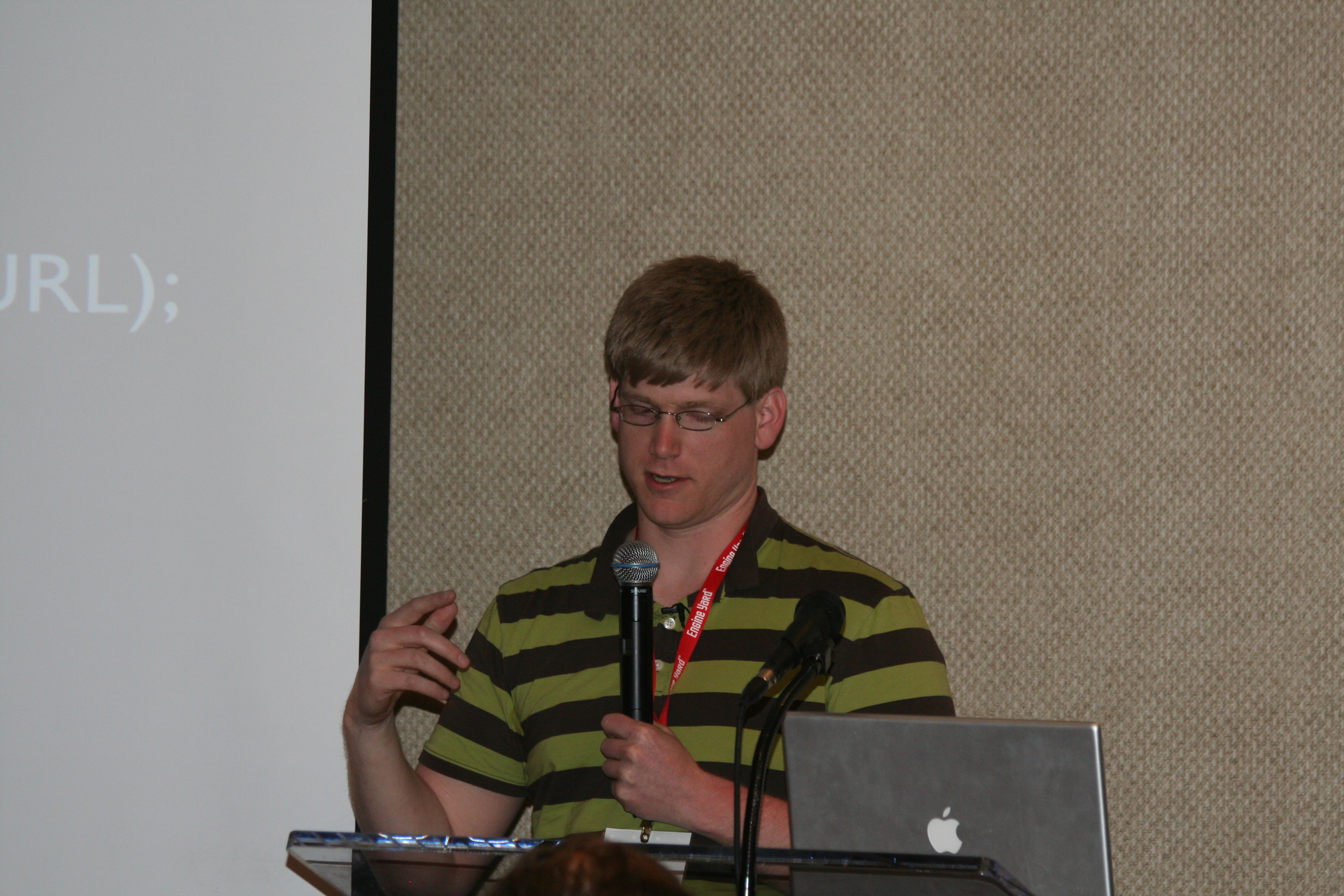
Moffitt (2009)

Jack Moffitt is an American computer scientist, software developer and entrepreneur, living in Eden Prairie, Minnesota.

== Career ==
He is a co-author of the GNU GPL licensed streaming media server, Icecast, and works on software using XMPP, JavaScript and Erlang. His work with Erlang has made him a regular presenter at the Erlang Factory conference series.

In November 2008, Moffitt co-founded Collecta, a real-time search company which uses XMPP and includes the Strophe library, for communication between client and server. Collecta launched its public beta in June 2009. He served as CTO for Collecta until some time in late 2010 when he left the company to work on other projects. He also worked on iOS development as part of Lunchbox Labs (the company which produced the iOS word game SnackWords) according to information on his LinkedIn profile. In 2011, he was listed on the credits as one of the "Server Developers" for the iOS MMORPG ShadowCities produced by Grey Area Software.

In 2012, Moffitt joined TalkTo, an internet startup which allows users to send questions via an application or SMS and have agents at TalkTo answer their questions or conduct research for them. His role was as "Lead Architect" according to the ErlangFactory conference website for his 2012 talk there. TalkTo reportedly uses XMPP for some of its communication which may explain his involvement. On the TalkTo blog, a birthday message to Moffitt was displayed referencing him as a "team member" and included a happy birthday message which was in a XMPP code stanza. Former Chesspark and Collecta coworker, Nathan Zorn, who is also an active member of the open source community, appears in the image holding up the sign on the About page of the TalkTo website, indicating he is also a TalkTo employee, though whether he or Moffitt joined first is unknown.

In March 2013, Moffitt left TalkTo and joined Mozilla in the role of Senior Research Engineer to work on Servo. In 2015, he spoke at Linux Australia's linux.conf.au conference about the goals and challenges in the ongoing development of Servo in a talk called "Building a Parallel Browser". He later also worked as Project Manager for the Mozilla team working on the Daala video codec.

=== XMPP work and publications ===
Jack Moffitt was a member of the XMPP XSF 2005-2006 and 2008-2014 with his 2015 application pending. He has served on the board of the XMPP Standards Foundation, or XSF. He is the author of a 2009 book about how to write XMPP applications titled, "Professional XMPP with JavaScript and jQuery" (ISBN 0470540710).
