= Continuous Media Markup Language =

Continuous Media Markup Language (CMML) is a markup language for audio or video, in the same way that HTML is one for text. CMML is essentially a timed text codec. It allows file creators to structure a time-continuously sampled data file by dividing it into temporal sections (also called clips), and provides these clips with some additional information. This information is HTML-like and is essentially a textual representation of the audio or video file. CMML enables textual searches on these otherwise binary files.

CMML is appropriate for use with all Ogg media formats, to provide subtitles and timed metadata.

CMML is deprecated; Xiph.Org Foundation recommends use Kate instead.

== Example of CMML Content ==
<cmml>
  <stream timebase="0">
    <import src="galaxies.ogv" contenttype="video/ogg"/>
  </stream>
  <head>
    <title>Hidden Galaxies</title>
    <meta name="author" content="CSIRO"/>
  </head>
  <clip id="findingGalaxies" start="15">
    <a href="http://www.aao.gov.au/galaxies.anx#radio">
      Related video on detection of galaxies
    </a>
    <img src="galaxy.jpg"/>
    <desc>What's out there?</desc>
    <meta name="KEYWORDS" content="Radio Telescope"/>
  </clip>
</cmml>
