= Liquidsoap =

Programming language for stream generation

- Developers: Romain Beauxis and Samuel Mimram
- Release: 2004
- Stable release: 2.4.5 / June 15, 2026; 3 months ago
- Written in: OCaml
- Operating system: Unix-like and Microsoft Windows
- Type: Stream generator
- License: GPL-2.0-or-later
- Website: www.liquidsoap.info
- Repository: github.com/savonet/liquidsoap

Liquidsoap is a scripting language oriented toward the creation of audio and video streams, the manipulation of multimedia files, automation, serving as webserver back-end and more. The language is functional, statically typed with type inference. The language is an original one, but the interpreter is programmed in OCaml and provided as free software.

Streams can be created from various sources such as soundcard captures, playlists, dynamic requests, or online streams. On those signal processing effects can be applied. The streams can be encoded in various formats such as MP3 or Opus, and the actual streaming is performed by serving generated HLS playlists or by using streaming software such as Icecast. Although originally targeted at audio streams, the generation of video stream is also supported.

== Usage ==
Liquidsoap is used as a back-end for radio streaming software such as Airtime, AzuraCast or LibreTime. It is also used by many radios to generate online streams such as the French national radio Radio France, or the Live365 radio network.

== Script examples ==
Scripts mostly consist of variables describing sources generating streams, which can be combined using operators.

For instance, a source can be defined from an online stream by

s1 = input.http("https://server.org:8000/stream")

which can later on be amplified by

s1 = amplify(2., s1)

A source can also be defined from a playlist by

s2 = playlist("my_playlist")

A source which will play one or the other of the above sources depending on the time of the day can be created by

s = switch[({ 6h-22h }, s1), ({ 22h-6h }, s2)]

Finally, the resulting source can be broadcast by an Icecast server as an mp3 stream with

output.icecast(%mp3, host="localhost", port=8000, password="hackme", mount="radio", s)
