= JetAudio =

Korean shareware media player

Cowon Media Center – JetAudio

- The Main Window in JetAudio 8.0.17.
- Developer: Cowon Systems, Inc.
- Release: 1997; 29 years ago
- Stable release: 8.1.10.22000 (8 June 2023; 3 years ago)
- Platform: Microsoft Windows, Android, iOS
- Available in: 11 languages
- Type: Media player
- License: Proprietary; Basic: Shareware; Plus VX: Commercial
- Website: www.jetaudio.com

JetAudio is a shareware media player application for Microsoft Windows and Android released in 1997 which offers playback options for a wide range of multimedia file formats.

JetAudio offers functions such as music and video playback, metadata editing, CD ripping and burning, data conversion, sound recording, and Internet radio broadcasting. It also includes numerous sound effects.

== Features ==
=== File format support ===
JetAudio supports all major audio and video file formats, including for audio: MP3, AAC, FLAC and Ogg Vorbis, Monkey’s Audio, True Audio, Musepack and WavPack.

For video it supports the following formats: H.264, MPEG-4, MPEG-2, MPEG-1, WMV and Ogg Theora.

=== Sound effects and enhancements ===
JetAudio features a number of built-in sound effects, including:

- A 10-band non-parametric equalization filter
- BBE (exciter) and BBE ViVA (spatializer) sound effects
- “X-Bass” and “X-Surround”
- “Wide”
- Reverb
- Time stretching
- Pitch change
- A variety of other special effects, including:
  - “Flange”
  - “Invert Flange”
  - “Robot 1”
  - “Robot 2”
  - “Slow chorus”
  - “Phase shift”
  - “Invert Phase Shift”

=== Music visualization ===
Like many other media player applications, JetAudio offers the option of displaying an animated visualization synchronized with music: MilkDrop, PixelTrip, Space and Synesthesia. Additional visualization plugins can be downloaded from external providers.

=== Lyric support ===
JetAudio has the ability to display both synchronized and unsynchronized lyrics to the music. Lyrics are displayed in the dedicated Lyrics Viewer window, along with the album art of the file and optionally a spectrum visualization.

=== Plugins ===
JetAudio supports most Winamp plug-ins.

=== Other features ===
JetAudio also offers the following additional features:

- bookmarking the current position in a song
- looping a section of a song
- a dropdown on-screen display with configurable content
- a configurable “sleep timer” to shut down the computer after a set period of playback.

== JetAudio for Android ==
The JetAudio for Android icon.

On 24 May 2012, “JetAudio for Android,” mobile version was released.

Initially, the app included the same BBE sound effects found in the desktop version of JetAudio, but these were removed in version 1.0.2 on 8 June 2012.

== See also ==
- Cowon
- Comparison of video player software
- List of audio conversion software
