= Cowon =

South Korean consumer electronics manufacturer

Cowon Systems, Inc. 코원시스템
- Company type: Public
- Traded as: KOSDAQ: 056000
- Industry: Consumer electronics Computer software Online services Cell phone accessories
- Founded: April 1995
- Founder: Park Namkyu; Jung Jaewook
- Headquarters: Seoul, South Korea
- Area served: South Korea, United States, Japan, India
- Key people: Park Namkyu (president)
- Products: MP3 players: iAUDIO 9+; D20 (Western markets only); X9; Z2 Plenue; iAUDIO 10; C2; D3 Plenue; X7; List of Cowon products#Cowon J3; iAUDIO E2; iAUDIO 9; D2+ (Korea only; discontinued in the West); S9 (Korea only; discontinued in the West); D2 (Korea only; discontinued in the West); PMP: Cowon G7 (Korea only); T5 (Korea only); A5 Plenue; R7 (Korea only); V5S (Korea only); 3D (Korea only); V5W (Korea only); V5; O2 (Korea only; discontinued in the West); P5 Study (Korea only); P5 (Korea only; discontinued in the West); Software: JetAudio; JetVideo; JetVD; Vokhan; Other products: Q7 Plenue; AD1 (Korea only); AC1; W2; L3; N3 (Korea only)
- Services: Services list: Cowon Contents; Cowon Mobile; Cowon Shop; JetToy
- Revenue: KRW 121.2 billion (2010)
- Operating income: KRW 9.1 billion (2010)
- Net income: KRW 7.4 billion (2010)
- Total assets: KRW 72.4 billion (2010)
- Number of employees: 193
- Subsidiaries: JetAudio, Inc. LIAAIL idea & art
- Website: COWONGLOBAL.com www.jetaudio.com eng.liaail.com

Cowon Systems, Inc. (Korean: 코원시스템; simply known as Cowon) is a South Korean consumer electronics and software corporation. The company's initial focus was software development and microelectronics, specializing in speech synthesis and speech recognition technology. In 2000, with the introduction of the iAUDIO CW100, Cowon expanded into the portable media player industry, which is now the core of their business.

In the west, Cowon is most well known for its iAUDIO range of portable media players, which has resulted in many people incorrectly referring to the company as "Cowon iAUDIO" or simply "iAUDIO." Outside the domestic market, Cowon iAUDIO's sales and market share have always been minuscule - however, it gained a certain niche market and retains a loyal following from fans and enthusiasts.

== Products ==
In its marketing, Cowon distinguishes between "MP3 players" and "portable media players," where the latter are larger and have a greater focus on video playback. The categories differ slightly between the Korean and the global homepage.

All Cowon products are produced domestically in South Korea.

=== MP3 players ===
- Cowon M2 (2014)
- Cowon E3 (2014)
- iAUDIO 9+ (2013)
- Cowon D20 (2013)
- Cowon X9 (2012)
- iAUDIO 10 (2011)
- Cowon C2 (2011)
- Cowon X7 (2010)
- Cowon J3 (2010)
- iAUDIO E2 (2009)
- iAUDIO 9 (2009)
- Cowon S9 (2008)

=== LIAAIL products ===
Cowon’s LIAAIL division, founded in 2011, focuses on personal audio and cell phone accessories. Among its products can be found:

- Earphones
  - Cowon BT2
  - Cowon EM1
  - Cowon EF1
  - Cowon XE1
  - Cowon CE1
  - Cowon SE2
  - Cowon EM2
- Cell phone cases
  - Bird Case
  - Tree Case
  - Leather Case
  - Jelly Case
- Cell phone screen protectors

=== Other products ===
- Cowon AD1, car camera released in 2012
- Cowon AC1, car camera released in 2012
- Cowon W2, Windows 7-based ultra-mobile PC released in 2010, available in 60 and 80 GB models
- Cowon W2 SSD, Windows 7-based ultra-mobile PC equipped with a solid state drive, released in 2010, available in a 32 GB model
- Cowon L3, GPS navigation device and in-car entertainment system released in 2009
- Cowon N3, GPS navigation device and in-car entertainment system released in 2007

=== Discontinued products ===
- Cowon D20
- Cowon iAUDIO 10
- Cowon C2
- Cowon D3 Plenue
- Cowon X7
- Cowon J3
- iAUDIO E2
- iAUDIO 9
- Cowon D2+
- Cowon S9
- Cowon D2
- Cowon iAUDIO 7

==== Portable media players ====
- Cowon G7
- Cowon T5
- Cowon Q7 Plenue
- Cowon A5 Plenue
- Cowon R7
- Cowon V5S
- Cowon 3D
- Cowon V5W
- Cowon V5
- Cowon O2
- Cowon iAUDIO X5
- Cowon A3
- Cowon A2

=== JetEffect ===
Each Cowon player is equipped with a set of software sound enhancement technologies collectively referred to as JetEffect. The latest version of JetEffect, JetEffect 5, was introduced with the release of the Cowon Z2 Plenue.

JetEffect competes with products such as Sony's DSEE, Samsung's DNSe, and the SRS technologies found in products by iriver and Samsung and in products by HTC and HP, where they are branded as "Beats Audio".

==== Features ====
In its latest iteration, JetEffect contains the following sound effects and enhancements:

- Five-band equalizer
- BBE+
  - BBE+
  - BBE Mach3Bass
  - BBE 3D Surround
  - BBE MP Enhance
- Special Effects
  - Reverb
  - Stereo Enhance

==== History ====
- JetEffect 2.0
- JetEffect 3.0
- JetEffect 5

== Software ==
=== Computer software ===
- JetAudio, media player application for Microsoft Windows first released in 1997
- JetVideo, video player application for Microsoft Windows with features which partially overlap with those of JetAudio. Like JetAudio, it relies on external codecs (such as those included in the K-Lite Codec Pack) for some of its data decoding.

=== Android apps ===
- JetAudio for Android
- JetVD

JetVD is an Android application for downloading videos from YouTube in a wide selection of formats. It was first introduced to users of the Cowon D3 Plenue with the upgrade to firmware version x.55. An online version of JetVD, called JetToy, exists in beta stage.

=== Other software ===
Other software developed by Cowon includes the iAUDIO LDB Manager, a small application for tagging music files with timecoded lyrics displayable on Cowon media players as well as in JetAudio.

Cowon also offers a number of freeware utilities, including JetCast, JetMailMonitor and JetToolBar. All of the above are available for free download from the JetAudio website.

Cowon's ultra-mobile PCs W2 and W2 SSD come with JetToolbar pre-installed.

== See also ==
- iAUDIO
- JetEffect
- JetAudio
- List of Cowon products
- Cowon Z2 Plenue
- Cowon J3
- Cowon S9
- Cowon D2
