= Telechips =

South Korean manufacturing company

- Type: public
- Traded as: KOSDAQ: 054450
- Industry: Semiconductors; Electronics
- Founded: October 1999
- Headquarters: Seongnam-si, South Korea
- Key people: JangKyu Lee (CEO)
- Products: System on a chip, Application Processor, Communication ICs
- Revenue: 186,615,513,099 won (2024)
- Operating income: 4,874,251,656 won (2024)
- Number of employees: 500+ (February 2024)
- Website: telechips.com

Telechips (Korean: 텔레칩스) is a fabless manufacturing company headquartered in Seoul, South Korea, that designs integrated circuits. It was founded in 1999 with regional offices in Japan (Tokyo), China (Shenzhen, Shanghai, Dalian), USA (Irvine, Detroit), Germany (Munich) and Singapore.

== Products ==
The company sells system on a chip products used in intelligent automotive cockpit systems and Smart STB/OTT. These are based on the ARM architecture and support Android, Windows Embedded Compact, Nucleus RTOS, AUTOSAR, freeRTOS, QNX, Green Hills, Free OSEK, and Linux. The Dolphin5 SoCs was showcased in 2023 and can be used for ADAS as well as In-car entertainment systems, while the simultaneously showed N-Dolphin SoC is aimed at AI algorithms such as image processing.

List of application processors:

- TCC803x (Dolphin+) (ARM Cortex-A53 Quad, Cortex-A7 Quad, Cortex-R5)
- TCC899x (Lion) (ARM Cortex-A53 Quad)
- TCC802x (Dolphin) (ARM Cortex-A7 Quad, Cortex-A7 Single, Cortex-M4)
- TCC898x (Alligator) (ARM Cortex-A53 Quad)
- TCC897x (ARM Cortex-A7 Quad)
- TCC893x (ARM Cortex-A9 Dual Core)
- TCC892x (ARM Cortex-A5)
- TCC880x (ARM Cortex-A8)
- TCC890x (ARM 11)
- TCC8010 (ARM 9)
- TCC800x-i

List of Companion & Communication ICs:

- TCC3171 / TCC3170 (T-DMB/DAB)
- TCC3510 / TCC3520 (T-DMB/DVB-T/One-Seg/CMMB)
- TCC3530 / TCC3531 / TCC3532 (ISDB-T)
- TCM3840 (Bluetooth, 802.11 ac, WiFi Module)
- TCM3910 (Bluetooth Module)
- TCM3902 (Bluetooth Module)
- TCC7604 (Audio DSP)
- TCC5027 (PMIC)
- TCC5028 (PMIC)
- AD55 (Video Decoder)

== See also ==
- Encipher Inye
