= Comparison of music streaming services =

The following is a list of on-demand music streaming services as well as a feature comparison chart. These services offer streaming of full-length content via the Internet as a part of their service, without the listener necessarily having to purchase a file for download. This type of service is somewhat similar to Internet radio. Many of these sites have advertising that supports free-to-listen options as well as paid subscription-based premium options.

Some services offer non-free options in the style of a digital music store. For a list of online music stores that provide a means of purchasing and downloading music as files of some sort, see comparison of digital music stores. Many sites from both of these categories offer services similar to an online music database.

== Currently active services ==
Service	Free access	Selective streaming	Lossless	Hi-res	Track downloads	Official music credits	Lyrics	Podcasts	# of tracks (millions)	# of active users (millions)	# of paying users (millions)	Global availability	Web	Android	iOS	Desktop	Other platforms	Launch date	Login required
AccuRadio	Yes	Yes	No	No	No	No	No	No	?	1.5		Yes	Yes	Yes	Yes	Yes	Roku, Sonos	2000	No (Note: Can listen, but liking songs, creating blends, and having own 5-Star Radio requires login)
Amazon Music	Yes	Yes	Yes	Yes	Yes	Yes	Yes	Yes	100+	52.5	52.5	Partial (Note: Australia, Austria, Brazil, Canada, France, Germany, Ireland, Italy, India, Japan, Mexico, New Zealand, Poland, Switzerland, Spain, US, UK)	Yes	Yes	Yes	Windows, Mac	10 other (Note: Amazon Echo, Fire TV, Bose, Sonos, BlackBerry, Xbox, Apple TV, CarPlay, Android Auto, Roku)	2007-09-25	Yes
Anghami	Partial (radio mode)	Yes	No	No	Yes		Yes		30	70		Partial (Note: Full access in Middle East and North Africa, Arabic music only elsewhere)	Yes	Yes	Yes	Yes	11 other (Note: BlackBerry, CarPlay, Android Auto, Chromecast, PlayStation, Apple Watch, Wear OS, Apple TV, Android TV, WebOS, Samsung TV)	2012-11	Limited (Note: Can listen, but playing songs requires login)
Apple Music	Partial (radio mode)	Yes	Yes	Yes	Yes	Yes	Yes	Yes (Note: Through the separate Apple Podcasts app on iPhone, iPad and Mac)	100+	108	108	Partial (Note: 167 countries)	Yes	Yes	Yes	Windows, Mac	12 other (Note: Android, AirPlay, Apple TV, Apple Watch, Apple HomePod, CarPlay, Mac, Amazon Echo, Sonos, PlayStation 5, Xbox Series X and S, Xbox One)	2015-06-30	Yes
Audiomack	Yes	Yes	No	Yes	Yes	Yes	No	Yes	50	40		Yes	Yes	Partial	Yes	Yes		2012	Yes
Bandcamp	Yes	—N/a	Partial (Download Only)	Partial (Download Only)	Yes								Yes	Yes	Yes	Windows		2008-09-16	Partial
Boomplay	Yes	Yes	No	No	Yes				58+			Yes	Yes	Yes	Yes	No	Android TV	2015	Limited
Deezer	Partial (radio mode)	Yes	Yes	No	Yes	Partial	Yes	Yes	120	16	9.6	Partial (Note: 185+ countries)	Yes	Yes	Yes	Yes	10 other (Note: Bose, Sonos, Chromecast, webOS, Symbian, BlackBerry, Fitbit, Android TV, Xbox, Apple TV)	2007	Yes
Gaana	Yes	Yes	No	No	Yes				45	201		Global	Yes	Yes	Yes	Yes		2010-04	Limited (Note: Can listen, but liking songs requires login)
hoopla	Yes	Yes	No	No	Yes				5	2.5		US, Canada	Yes	Yes	Yes	Yes	ChromeOS, Roku, AirPlay, Chromecast,	2010	Yes
IDAGIO	Partial (radio mode)	Yes	Yes	No	Yes	Yes			2			Global	Yes	Yes	Yes	Windows, Mac		2015	Yes
iHeartRadio	Partial (radio mode)	Partial (Plus & All Access)	No	No	Partial (All Access)	No	No	Yes	30	120		US, Australia, New Zealand	Yes	Yes	Yes	Mac	Bose, Sonos, PlayStation, Xbox, Fire TV, Roku, Apple TV, Android TV, Chromecast	2008-08-01	No
Jango	Yes	No	No	No	No				30			Global	Yes	Yes	Yes	No		2007-11	No
Joox	Partial (radio mode)	Yes	Yes	Yes	Yes	No	Yes	Yes	30+	80		Partial (Note: Hong Kong, Indonesia, Malaysia, Myanmar, Thailand)	Yes	Yes	Yes	Yes		2015	No
KKBox	Yes	Yes	Yes	Yes	Yes				70			Partial (Note: Hong Kong, Japan, Malaysia, Singapore, Taiwan.)	Yes	Yes	Yes	Yes	Roon, Chromecast, Android TV, Android Auto, Apple TV, Xbox	2004-10	Yes
Line Music	No	Yes	No	No	Yes				1.5			Japan, Thailand, Taiwan	Yes	Yes	Yes	No		2015-05-22	Yes
LiveOne	Partial (radio mode)	Yes	No	No	Yes			Yes	30	3.7	>2	US, Canada	Yes	Yes	Yes	Yes	Sonos, Tesla, Roku	2007-03-15	No
Melon	Yes	Yes	No	No	Yes					4–5		South Korea	Yes	Yes	Yes	No		2004-11	Yes
Moov	No	Yes	Yes	Yes	Yes				1.5			Hong Kong, China, Vietnam	Yes	Yes	Yes	No	Chromecast, Apple Watch	2006-04-24	Yes
Music Choice	Yes	No	No	No									Yes	Yes	Yes	Yes		2004	Yes (Note: Cable subscribers only)
MyTuner Radio	Yes	No	No	No									Yes	Yes	Yes	Yes	7 other (Note: Samsung TV, LG TV, Android TV, Alexa, Sonos, CarPlay, Android Auto)	2012-04	No
NetEase Cloud Music	Yes	Yes	Yes	Yes	Yes	Yes	Yes	Yes	136	206.7	41.75	Partial	Yes	Yes	Yes	Windows, Mac, Linux	BlackBerry	2013	Limited
Pandora	Partial (radio mode)	Yes	No	No	Yes	Yes	Yes		30	58	6.3	US	Yes	Yes	Yes	Windows, Mac (Note: Desktop clients only available with Pandora One subscription)	14 other (Note: BlackBerry, Bose, Chromecast, Android TV, PlayStation, Fire TV, Roku, Apple TV, Sonos, Amazon Echo, Google Home, TiVo, Xbox One, Fitbit)	2005-09	No
Qobuz	No	Yes	Yes	Yes	Yes	Yes	Yes		100+	0.2	0.2	Partial (Note: France, UK, Netherlands, Germany, Italy, Spain, US)	Yes	Yes	Yes	Yes	Roon, Linn, Sonos, BubbleUPnP	2007	Yes
QQ Music	Yes	Yes	Partial	Yes	Yes	Yes	Yes	Yes	200+	660	113.5	Partial	Yes	Yes	Yes	Yes	Bose	2005	Limited
ROXi	No	Yes	No	No	No				40			UK, US	No	No	No	No	ROXi	2016	Yes
JioSaavn	Yes	Yes	No	No	Yes				55+	250		Global	Global	Yes	Yes	Yes	Amazon Echo, Google Nest, Sonos One, Shazam	2007	Limited
SiriusXM	Partial (radio mode)	Yes	No	No				Yes		34.9		Canada, US	Yes	Yes	Yes	Yes	Bose, Sonos, Roku	2008-07-29	
SoundCloud	Yes	Yes	Partial	No	Limited				200+	175	1.7	Global	Yes	Yes	Yes	Yes	Sonos, Xbox One	2008-10	No
Spotify	Yes	Yes	Yes	No	Yes	Yes	Yes	Yes	100+	788	306	Partial (Note: 184 countries)	Yes	Yes	Yes	Windows, Mac, Linux	25 other (Note: Bose, Palm, Sonos, Symbian, Android TV, Android Auto, CarPlay, Boxee, Telia Digital-TV, Virgin TiVo, Linux, PlayStation, Xbox, BlackBerry, Chromecast, Amazon Echo, Google Home, Tesla, WebOS, Apple TV, Fire TV, Roku, ComcastX1, Apple Watch, Wear OS)	2008-10	Yes
Stingray Music	Partial (radio mode)	No	Partial (Premium)	No					25+			Global	Yes	Yes	Yes	Yes	Sonos	2014	Partial (Note: Free in Canada and US, TV subscription required in other countries))
Tidal	No	Yes	Yes	Yes	Yes	Yes	Yes		110+	4.2	3	Partial	Yes	Yes	Yes	Windows, Mac	Roon, Sonos, Chromecast, Android TV, Apple TV, Fire TV, Roku	2014-10-28	Limited (Note: Preview only)
TuneIn	Partial (radio mode)	Partial	No	No	Partial (Premium)					75		Global	Yes	Yes	Yes	Yes (Windows Store)	8 other (Note: Bose, Sonos, Fire TV, Roku, Xbox One, PSVita, PS3, HoloLens, Squeezebox, Tesla)	2002-01	No
VIBE	No	Yes	No	No								South Korea	Yes	Yes	Yes	Yes		2018	Yes
Wolfgang's	Yes	Yes	No	No	Yes				0.2			Partial	Yes	Yes	Yes	Yes	Sonos	2006	Yes
YouTube Music	Yes	Yes	No	No	Yes	Yes	Yes	Yes	100+	125	125	Partial (Note: 119 countries)	Yes	Yes	Yes	Yes (PWA)	7 other (Note: Amazon Alexa, Google Home, Sonos, Chromecast, Google TV, Android TV, Android Auto, Apple CarPlay, Tesla)	2015-11	No

== Discontinued services ==
Service	Reason	Discontinued
Radical.fm	Shut down	29 June 2018
Xbox Music Pass	Succeeded by Groove Music Pass	6 July 2015
iTunes Radio	Integrated into Apple Music	30 June 2015
Beats Music	Succeeded by Apple Music	30 June 2015
Blinkbox Music	Under administration	11 June 2015
Groove Music Pass	Shut down	31 December 2017
Grooveshark	Shut down	30 April 2015
Google Play Music	Merged with YouTube Music	31 December 2020
Guvera	Shut down	12 May 2017
Rara	Shut down	29 March 2015
Last.fm	Discontinued radio streaming service; now a database for tracking listening histories	28 April 2014
Batanga Radio	Shut down	25 December 2017
MixRadio	Shut down	21 March 2016
Music Unlimited	Replaced by PlayStation Music powered by Spotify.	29 March 2015
Musicovery	Shut down the interactive radio service and now a music playlist supplier.	2 January 2017
Electric Jukebox	Succeeded by ROXi	1 August 2017
WiMP	Integrated into Tidal	23 March 2015
Simfy	Shut down. Temporarily, the website referred users to Deezer.	1 March 2015
MOG	Succeeded by Beats Music and subsequently Apple Music	21 January 2015
Songza	Merged into Google Play Music and subsequently into YouTube Music	21 October 2014
Ubuntu One Music	Discontinued	2 April 2014
Zune Pass	Succeeded by Xbox Music Pass and subsequently by Groove Music Pass	15 October 2012
Mflow	Succeeded by Bloom.fm	1 January 2012
Thumbplay	Acquired by iHeartRadio	1 March 2011
Rdio	Shut down / Assets purchased by Pandora	22 December 2015
Rhapsody	Succeeded by Napster	14 June 2016
thesixtyone	Shut down	1 May 2017
Yahoo! Music Unlimited	Shut down (users offered option to transfer account to Rhapsody)	30 September 2008
Spinner	Merged into Netscape Radio	2002
Slacker Radio	Succeeded by LiveXLive	25 April 2019
LiveXLive	Succeeded by LiveOne	6 October 2021

== Comparison of free music and radio streaming platforms ==
Service	Audio Quality	Podcasts	Live Radio	Offline Playback	Platforms
Spotify (Free)	Up to 160 kbps	Yes	No	No	Android, iOS, Web, Desktop
YouTube Music (Free)	AAC (128–160 kbps)	Yes (via YouTube)	No	No	Android, iOS, Web
JioSaavn(Free)	Upto 320 kbps	Yes	Yes	Yes (with pro subscription)	Android, iOS, Web, Desktop, Alexa echo device
Gaana	Upto 320kbps	Yes	Yes	Yes (with pro subscription)	Android, iOS
TuneIn	Standard-quality streaming	Yes	Yes	No	Android, iOS, Smart speakers, Web
iHeartRadio	Standard-quality streaming	Yes	Yes	No (free tier)	Android, iOS, Web
Audials Play	Standard-quality streaming	Yes	Yes	Yes (recording feature)	Android, iOS, Windows
X-Radio.net	Standard	No	Yes	No	Android, iOS, Web
Online Radio Box	Standard	No	Yes	No	Android, iOS, Web
Radio Garden	Standard	No	Yes	No	Web, Android, iOS
myTuner Radio	Standard	Yes	Yes	No	Android, iOS, Smart TVs, Web
Eter	Standard	No	Yes	No	iOS, macOS
Broadcasts (Free)	Standard	No	Yes	No	iOS, macOS
Audacy	Standard	Yes	Yes	Limited (replays)	Android, iOS, Web
X-FM.net	Standard	No	Yes	No	Web, Mobile Browsers

Note: Audio quality and feature sets vary; some features may require optional login but not payment.

== See also ==
- Comparison of digital music stores
- Comparison of online music lockers
- List of music software
- List of Internet radio stations
- List of online music databases
- Rate Your Music – Online music and film cataloging website
