= T61 =

T61, T.61 or T-61 may refer to:

- Allison T61, a turboprop engine
- BAE Hualcopo, a tank landing ship of the Ecuadorean Navy
- Cooper T61, a British sports racing car
- Embutramide, a potent sedative drug used for euthanasia
- INS Trinkat (T61), a patrol vessel of the Indian Navy
- ITU T.61, a character set standard
- Lola T61, a British Formula Two racing car
- Slingsby T.61 Falke, a British glider
- thesixtyone, a music discovery website
- ThinkPad T61, a laptop computer
- T61 (classification), an IPC para-athletics classification for athletes with limb differences
