= T60 =

T60 or T-60 may refer to:

== Automobiles ==
- Berkeley T60, a British three-wheel microcar
- Cooper T60, a British Formula One racing car
- Lola T60, a British Formula Two racing car
- Maxus T60, a Chinese pickup truck
- Venucia T60, a Chinese crossover
- Yema T60, a Chinese SUV

== Military vehicles ==
- HMS Gnat (T60), a gunboat of the Royal Navy
- T-60 tank, a Soviet light tank
- TACAM T-60, a Romanian tank destroyer

== Other uses ==
- Boeing T60, an American turboshaft engine
- Canon T60, a film camera
- Stonewall County Airport, in Aspermont, Texas, United States
- ThinkPad T60, a laptop
- T60, a Vox bass amplifier
