= ROXi =

Music streaming service

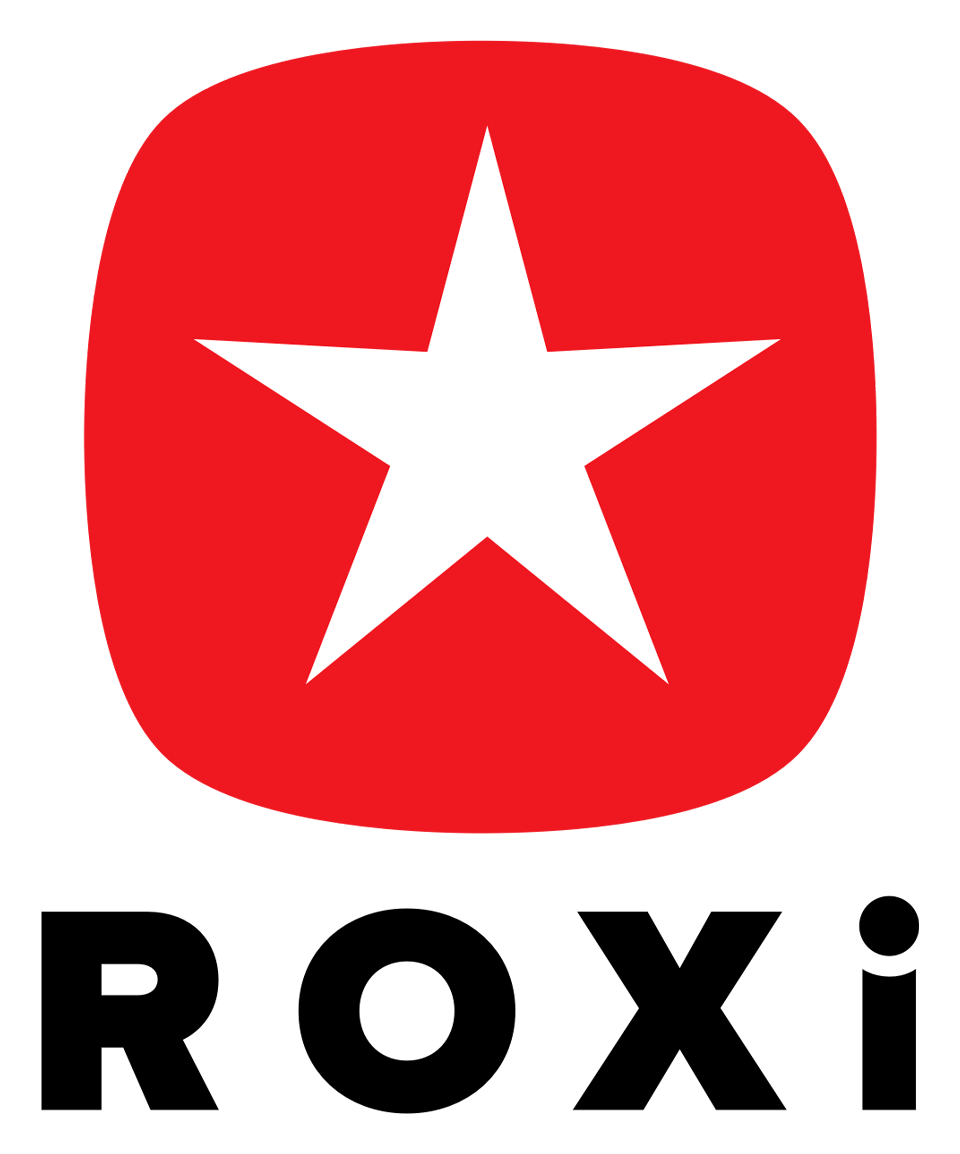
- Developer: ROXi
- Type: Digital media player
- Released: August 2017
- Sound: up to 320 kbps streaming
- Connectivity: Wi-Fi; HDMI; 3.5 mm audio jack
- Power: Mains power (HDMI Set Top Box) Micro-USB (Controller)
- Website: roxi.tv

ROXi (/ˈrɒxiː/ ROCK-si) is a television-based music entertainment experience providing full catalogue music streaming, radio, karaoke, music games, sound machine and photo visuals via a TV user interface on pay TV and Smart TV platforms and via ROXi Music System; a dedicated digital media player.

== Technology ==
ROXi products and services facilitate communal interaction with music, providing a shared experience for multiple users via the TV, rather than individually to phones, computers or tablets. T3 describes ROXi as "a system designed to get friends and family together round the (TV) screen and remove them from isolated behaviour, such as wearing headphones, and instead enjoying the tunage together."

ROXi Music System is a console or set top box that connects to a TV via HDMI and gets its data (the audio visual music stream) via a Wi-Fi or Ethernet connection from an Internet router.[1][2] The ROXi streaming device has a Wii-style gesture-based wireless controller with a built-in microphone for voice commands and voice search and singing Karaoke. ROXi Music System plays through a TV but can connect to a soundbar, soundbase, home theatre system or any other speaker via 3.5mm auxiliary or Bluetooth. The data is output to the TV is via a HDMI connector.

== Features ==
Unlimited Music Streaming: ROXi is licensed by major music rights holders Sony Music Entertainment, Universal Music Group and Warner Music Group and MERLIN providing a catalogue of 55 million songs to stream on ROXi. The music catalogue is automatically updated on a weekly basis with new releases from music rights holders.

Karaoke: ROXi has 60,000 karaoke-style singalong songs. ROXi’s Sing With The Stars singalong feature provides the original artist recording along with scrolling on-screen lyrics. ROXi also features traditional Karaoke tracks without the lead vocal. ROXi Music System’s wireless controller has a built-in microphone for karaoke singalongs. T3 named ROXi one of its best karaoke gadgets when it launched in 2017.

== Partnerships ==
ROXi launched on Sky Q set top box in to millions of homes across the UK on 8 September 2020. This was the first time ROXi partnered with a third-party platform to make music entertainment experience available without dedicated ROXi hardware. Sky provide ROXi on Sky Q for free for 30 days followed by a monthly subscription of £6.99/month. Sky Q subscribers control ROXi using the Sky Q remote control and a ROXi iOS and Android mobile companion app.

In the United States, ROXi partnered with Sinclair Broadcast Group to offer its services on its ATSC 3.0 lighthouse station to take advantage of the technology's features. While an internet connection is required to access ROXi from a DTV station, as such stations (as with all over-the-air television and radio stations) are regulated by the Federal Communications Commission, mild profanity is edited accordingly, with songs having excessive profanity not aired at all.

American affiliates for ROXi via ATSC 3.0 (all airing on the .21 digital subchannel of a Sinclair station) include stations in Albany, New York, Baltimore, Maryland, Birmingham, Alabama, Buffalo, New York, Charleston, South Carolina, Cincinnati, Ohio, Columbus, Ohio, Dayton, Ohio, Des Moines, Iowa, El Paso, Texas, Flint, Michigan, Fresno, California, Green Bay, Wisconsin, Greensboro, North Carolina, Greenville, South Carolina, Las Vegas, Nevada, Minneapolis, Minnesota, Mobile, Alabama-Pensacola, Florida, Nashville, Tennessee, Omaha, Nebraska, Pittsburgh, Pennsylvania, Portland, Maine, Raleigh, North Carolina, Rochester, New York, Salt Lake City, Utah, San Antonio, Texas, Seattle, Washington, Syracuse, New York, Washington, D.C. (via PBS station WHUT-TV instead of Sinclair-owned WJLA-TV), Wes Palm Beach, Florida, and Wichita, Kansas.

== Funding ==
ROXi has raised over $15m investment with early backing from former Take That member Robbie Williams, Sheryl Crow, Alesha Dixon, Stephen Fry as well as former F1 and McLaren executive Ron Dennis. Dennis owns a 10% stake in the company alongside investors such as Henrik Holmark, (the former finance chief of jewelry chain Pandora), Nigel Wray (owner of Saracens rugby club), U2's former manager Paul McGuinness, and TomTom co-founder Mark Gretton. Pop star Kylie Minogue took a stake in the company in November 2020.

== Criticism ==
ROXi was criticised for announcing a planned IPO on the London Stock Exchange which would have allowed the public to buy shares, but then instead raised money privately from McLaren Group executive Ron Dennis and other investors. The reason given by ROXi at the time was that Brexit meant raising money privately was less risky and that Brexit had created turbulent market conditions.

== Geographic availability ==
ROXi is available in:

- United Kingdom
- United States

== See also ==
- Comparison of on-demand streaming music services
- List of online music databases
- List of Internet radio stations
- Streaming media
- Apple Music
- Spotify
- Deezer
- Tidal
- Rhapsody
- Napster
- Pandora Radio
- IHeartRadio
- Amazon Fire TV
- Chromecast
- Roku
- Pure
- Roberts Radio
