= T43 =

T43 may refer to:

== Vehicles ==
- T-43 medium tank, a World War II Soviet medium tank
- T43 heavy tank, a pre-production model of the American M103 Heavy Tank
- T43-class minesweeper, a Soviet-designed minesweeper
- Boeing T-43, a 1973 United States Air Force military training and transport aircraft
- Cooper T43, a 1958 racing car
- SJ T43, a 1963 Swedish diesel-electric locomotive
- Slingsby T.43 Skylark 3, a British glider

== Other uses ==
- T43 (classification), a disabled sports handicap class for leg amputees
- IBM ThinkPad T43, a laptop model
