= Mulve =

Mulve, previously known as 'Search', was a short lived music download portable application that provided a front end for downloading music tracks from the Russian site Vkontakte. The development of the application started out as 'a hobby idea' according to one of the creators. However, due to one of the operators of Mulve being arrested by UK police, the developers decided to discontinue the development and release the source code of the application on Google Code.

Shortly after the developers distributed their code to the public, many people used the distributed code to build several alternate versions of the app, the most notable one of which was titled 'Mielophone and enhanced Mulve's original feature base.

The program was first made available in January 2008 in beta version to users of EVE Online forums, and then final version was launched to the general public in May 2010, with development discontinued in October 2010. For a short time in Autumn 2010, due to online word-of-mouth and some articles about Mulve, it seemed a popular alternative to peer-to-peer and despite labeling itself as a "music discovery program", it gave users the ability to search Russian social networking website Vkontakte for music that had been uploaded by its members.

== History ==
In January 2008, a user by the name of 'Ryysa' on EVE Online forums posted a new thread asking people to stress test an application he was working on, which he had named 'Search'.

"Hello. I have been developing a small windows program on the side every now and then, which allows you to search and download music, fast. Downloads are done via HTTP, you can find nearly any music on there at good quality.I have made it for myself, but quite a lot of my friends have tested it, and after fixing some bugs it seems to work fine.Be aware, that you are downloading this at your own risk. In short - if you install a keylogger on your computer, don't blame me later. You'll just have to trust me (or virustotal) that this file is clean."

Eric found interest the product and felt as if it was being under-utilised. Since he and his local friend had just started development on their email marketing app, originally Eric thought he could purchase the source code directly from the other developer, and manipulate it such that it promoted the release of their new app. However, after a conversation with his European partner he realized that it was far preferable to join up, brand it, and make a story out of it.

The domain name mulve.com was actually supposed to be an abbreviation for the words, 'Music Love', something that TorrentFreak has cited on their website after communicating with the founders.

== Features ==
- Portable application. Only Windows supported as of September, 2010.
- Relatively small size - 1.7 MB.
- A minimalist user interface.
- Automated updating, although this service was discontinued as of version 1.10 due to traffic issues.
- A small 90px ad banner on the top of the program inviting users to join the official Mulve Music Facebook group. (However, this banner did get interchanged with others from time to time).
- No P2P download requirements, nor any requirements to upload or 'seed' content back.

== Popularity ==
Between May 2010 and September 2010, Mulve had picked up some notoriety in the blogosphere with websites such as Torrentfreak, Wired, Lifehacker, CNN & many others in different parts of Europe frequently reporting on it. However, as Eric discussed in an episode of "The Business Wilderness" - a podcast that regularly interviews people demonstrating efficacy in business.The primary reason for what appeared to be mass overnight coverage of the software, was in fact due to a "multi-tiered PR strategy", Eric stated.

It is believed in the beginning the app had a count of users in the low thousands, and it was growing via word of mouth. The ad banner was designed exclusively by Eric which sat atop the application window, inviting people to join the Facebook community. In the words of Eric, "We didn't really catch our big break until the no. of users ticked over to 20,000 on the Facebook group."

"We launched in May, with around 1,000 users, and by July we were clocking over 50,000–100,000+ new app opens PER day (in our case a new app open meant, a unique new user had downloaded the app. Seeing as we needed to keep track of server size and the constant struggle of being shut down or not being able to load balance efficiently enough. The spikes were unpredictable... Towards the end we calculated that a total 2,921,741 users had tried Mulve".

== Thumbplay Revenue split/Acquisition Offer ==
At the height of Mulve's popularity towards October 2010, the Mulve team was contacted by an employee from Thumbplay - a popular mobile content provider at the time, annually grossing approximately $20 million in revenue. Two separate offers of an undisclosed amount were made to Mulve's founders to acquire the app and brand. However, no records of any offers being accepted were made public.

Moreover, Thumbplay then reached with a partnership proposal which would see them get offered a 50% - 50% revenue split on all song purchases from Thumbplay directed from the high number of daily app users. Though, this was rejected as the founders of Mulve believed it would betray the purpose of the company, as it was originally marketed as being completely free, easy to use without any sign up required.

Instead the creators opted to use the partnership to expand Mulve's functionality and "use the app's popularity to help get new artists discovered" - This quote originally appeared on article published by TorrentFreak.com on October 12, 2010, regarding the comparison of Mulve's services and a related app by the name of OiNK whose founder had also undergone legislative pressure to shut down.

== Mulve Italia ==
It appears as though Mulve was widely reported within the Italian media because at the height of its popularity, independent Facebook pages titled, 'Mulve Italia' were created as well as a separate website which has 4,700 likes. However, prior to this there many fan groups, and pages at the beginning of the decade when Facebook had a different user interface and functionality set. The Italian version of the website was titled mulveitalia.it, however the domain name expired at the end of 2011 and the website (which was originally a news created to chart the progress of the Mulve app) later became a host for another alternative of the app called 'The Pirate App and the website for which changed to pirateapp.it. The Facebook page for the Pirate App published its last official release for the app on 13 February 2014.

== Usage ==
The application was essentially a front end to the Russian site Vkontakte. The application allowed the users to search through the site's databases and turned up results which allowed the users to download the song they wanted. At the time, Vkontakte.ru allowed users to upload music and videos to its servers. Mulve effectively acted as a GUI for the site.

== Following on from Mulve ==
According to Eric Azizian's LinkedIn page, not long after the dismantlement of Mulve he continued to release other apps, this time focusing more around internet marketing, and/or a lead generation company.

The other developer & co-founder's real name was never disclosed in any interviews or transcripts, so his status is currently unknown to the public.
