= Hacker Radio Ltd =

Hacker Radio Limited manufactured domestic radio and audio equipment. The company was formed in Maidenhead by brothers Ron and Arthur Hacker in 1959, and traded successfully until 1977. Financial difficulties resulted in the company being sold and relaunched with the name Hacker Sound which closed in 1979.

== History ==
The Hacker brothers, Ron (born 1908) and Arthur (born 1910), founded Dynatron in the late 1920s with help from their father Harry, but in 1955 Ekco took over the company, which at the time employed 150 people. By 1959, the number of employees had risen to 250, but the Hacker brothers were uncomfortable with the arrangements and decided to set up their own company, Hacker Radio Limited. In December 1960 Ekco merged with Pye, then Pye was bought by Philips in 1967. In 1981, Roberts Radio bought Dynatron from Philips.

The Hacker brothers acquired a factory in Cox Green, Maidenhead, and started producing a range of transistor portable radios, beginning with the RP10 Herald. Throughout the 1960s, profits were healthy and the workforce increased. In 1973, the company was awarded its first Royal Warrant of appointment, and gained a second in 1976. But financial difficulties experienced in the 1970s caused the company significant problems, and despite cost-cutting measures, the firm's bankers called in the receivers in May 1977. The assets were bought by Pullmaflex and the company reformed as Hacker Sound; the Hacker brothers were retained as consultants. Arthur Hacker's son John, who had been made a director in 1975, was made Technical Director. However, difficulties continued, and the company was bought by Motoradio, who moved the operation to Bournemouth. Finally, a fire put an end to activities, and the Hacker trademark was purchased by Roberts Radio.

Hacker Radio primarily marketed its products to the UK domestic market, and were priced towards the top of the market. This, plus the relatively short period of operation (only two decades) results in a lower brand awareness today compared to other household names such as Roberts Radio. However, Hacker products have a strong following among vintage radio enthusiasts and collectors. An active group on Yahoo boasts over 400 members, and maintains a set database that lists almost 1000 Hacker sets (as of November 2011). Hacker sets are known to be in the possession of enthusiasts in the United States, Canada, Brazil, Australia, New Zealand, Japan, Korea, China, Russia, and throughout the European Union. It is worth noting that the RP75 Super Sovereign - with short wave reception - was ideal for receiving the BBC World Service in various Commonwealth countries. It meant expats around the world could keep abreast of the news from London, and listen to other World Service programmes.

== Company philosophy ==
The stated Hacker philosophy was to focus on technical performance rather than cost, and words to this effect are frequently found in printed material from the time. Many examples of their products survive today, and it is widely accepted among vintage radio enthusiasts that the build quality is higher than most similar sets from the same era.

== Notable models ==
Hacker produced many products during their 19 years of trading. Some of their more notable models are described below - a full list is available on-line.

=== Herald ===
The first product launched was the RP10 Herald. In common with many of their 1960s designs, this was built into a wooden case covered in leathercloth, with foam padding under the front and rear panels and a turntable to enable the set to be rotated for best reception (the internal ferrite rod aerial being highly directional). It featured a large (5 inch by 8 inch) 30Ω loudspeaker, and was powered by two PP9 batteries. Initial sets used Ediswan transistors; later sets used Mullard devices, including the AF117, which unfortunately went on to suffer from tin whisker formation within the encapsulation.

The Herald was an AM only set, covering the medium wave and long wave bands. A three position tone control switch was provided. The radio was initially available in beige or deep red with brass trim, but towards the end of the run, alternative colours were offered (blue with chrome and white trim, or black and grey, also with chrome trim).

The next Herald, the RP30, retained the same loudspeaker and grille, but had a restyled cabinet that retained the padded leathercloth, which was available in charcoal black, blue or red (the latter with brass trim). The electronic design was revised, and the audio amplifier was rather more complex, incorporating rotary bass and treble controls. Coverage was MW and LW as before, but a version including short wave (16.5 to 50 metres) was offered (the RP31SW). Later, another version offering Marine Band (70 to 200 metres) in addition to MW and LW was released (the RP32), but this sold in relatively small numbers, and few exist today. These sets continued to use the Mullard AF11x-series of transistors.

The RP35 looked quite similar to the RP30, but the top panel (containing the controls and tuning scale) is quite different in detail if not layout. The available colours were the same as the RP30 Herald. Electronically, these are quite different from the previous models, introducing a separate transistor for the oscillator, and a new, more compact layout for the IF PCB. The audio amplifier is improved while the component count is reduced - now the loudspeaker is 15Ω. Initially these used the Mullard AF117 transistors, but switched over to using silicon BF194 and BF195 "Lockfit" transistors from serial number 19001.

Another AM Herald, the RP82, was introduced towards the end of Hacker's existence, but few were produced. Electrically, they are based on the basic AM-only RP70 Ranger.

=== VHF Herald ===
The RP37 VHF Herald looked like a third-generation Herald, but the presence of a telescopic aerial indicated that this is an FM-capable receiver; indeed it was an FM-only radio. Like most Hacker sets from the 1960s and early 1970s, this set used two PP9 batteries. They were available in the same colour choices as the RP35 AM Herald, and there was a variant with a revised scale in royal blue that incorporated the Open University logo in place of the local stations. The terms of this arrangement are presently unclear.

Mirroring the changes in the RP25A Sovereign described below, the later RP37A VHF Herald had a revised FM tuner; recognisable because it has a clear plastic cover rather than an aluminium enclosure. At a similar time, the loudspeaker was changed from a grey painted unit made by Goodmans to a silver-framed Celestion or a unit supplied by Elac which was recognisable by the large ceramic magnet assembly. This latter loudspeaker was only ever fitted to the VHF Herald.

=== Sovereign ===
This was Hacker's premium portable model, featuring AM and FM reception, and the name was used for four generations of the receiver. The first three versions featured separate tuners and IF stages for the AM and FM sections. The first generation, the RP18 Sovereign, was released in 1964, and was slightly larger than the contemporary Herald. The case was leathercloth-covered wood with padding for the front and rear panels, and was only available in charcoal black. The same large loudspeaker was used. The FM front end was bought in from German company Görler, and the rest of the tuner sections used Mullard AF11x-series transistors. User-adjustable station markers were provided to indicate the position of three favourite stations - but as these could only be moved over the lower half of the FM band (which only extended to 101 MHz), they were intended to locate the three national BBC services available at the time.

The next generation, the RP25 Sovereign II, was very similarly styled, with the external differences being most noticeable on the top panel. This model was available in charcoal black and blue. The audio and AM sections were identical to the third-generation Herald, and the FM sections were a new design with the FM front end now made in-house; the FM and audio sections went on to appear in the RP37 VHF Herald. Initially, AF117s were used in the AM tuner, but from serial number 13001, BF194/195s were adopted (the FM sections used these silicon devices from the outset). This set introduced an ISM (inter-station muting) function for the FM band, operated by a switch that also enabled the AFC function, which eliminates the loud noises typically heard when tuning across the FM band. There are now four station markers, which can be placed anywhere within the band (which still only reached 101 MHz).

The RP25A had a redesigned FM front end; the new tuner is distinguishable by the clear plastic cover rather than the earlier aluminium case. At a similar time, the grey-painted Goodmans loudspeaker is replaced by a model made by Celestion - the later is recognisable because it has a painted silver frame and magnet. At some point towards the end of the RP25A production run, an 18 volt DC input socket is added to the left hand side panel. And finally, the RP25B uses a different FM IF PCB, incorporating an integrated circuit and ceramic filter. During the RP25A run, an all-white version was released. These are relatively uncommon today, and good examples can sell for higher prices than otherwise similar black or blue sets.

Next, in 1973, the RP72 Sovereign III is released with very different styling compared to the previous models - featuring teak side panels and extruded aluminium for the loudspeaker grille and top control panel assemblies. Separate AM and FM tuners are retained, while the audio stages gain a new pre-amplifier that incorporates passive Baxendall tone controls. The loudspeaker is slightly smaller at 7 by 5 inches, and is now supplied by Peerless. The set is powered by eight 1.5 volt "D-cells" rather than two PP9s. Earlier models had a DC-input socket on the back; later models incorporate a mains power supply and are designated RP72MB. While the majority of these sets are restricted to 101 MHz on the FM band, later models were able to tune to 104 MHz. The ISM function was dropped, but switchable AFC remains. A common problem with these sets concerns the screen printing on the top panel, which can wear away.

The final Sovereign - the RP77MB Sovereign IV - was rather different. It used simpler and cheaper circuitry that no longer had separate AM and FM sections. The case was somewhat larger because it was originally designed to accommodate a cassette mechanism; the RP77MB Sovereign IV was a radio-only version of the RPC1 radio-cassette recorder. The styling was similar to the previous model, with a black anodised finish to the aluminium components. The turntable was dropped for this model. As with the Sovereign III, operation is from eight D-cells or the mains supply, and MW, LW and FM (to 104 MHz) bands are covered. The amplifier circuitry is simpler than the Sovereign III; in fact, it's electrically very similar to that used in the Sovereign II - though with some component changes. The loudspeaker is a 5 by 8 inch model made by Elac.

=== Super Sovereign ===
There was a variation of the third-generation Sovereign called the RP75 Super Sovereign. This took the basic RP72 Sovereign and added two short wave bands - the only Hacker set to include both FM and SW. Coverage was 10.9 to 33 metres and 27.5 to 89 metres. Electronic fine-tuning (band-spread) was provided, and switchable ISM returned to the FM band; separate switches are provided for ISM and AFC, unlike the Sovereign II where these functions were combined on one switch. A signal-strength (and battery test) meter was provided. Echoing the development of the RP72, a mains power supply was added (the RP75MB), then the FM coverage was extended to 104 MHz. With the MB models, an ATU (aerial tuning unit) was included to improve short-wave reception. The speaker fitted to the RP75 and RP75MB was the same as the RP72, but with a larger magnet.

=== Hunter ===
The RP38 VHF Hunter was released in 1969, and was intended to be an "economy" set. It had MW, LW and VHF coverage. The cabinet was also cheaper to make and lacked a turntable. Initial models used the same 5" by 8" Goodmans loudspeaker as the contemporary RP35 Herald/RP25 Sovereign, but a model from Elac quickly replaced this.

An updated version followed a year later: the RP38A. This added bass and treble controls, using an amplifier that was electrically very similar to that in the RP35/RP25. This model was in production for many years, and went through several cosmetic changes before production ended in 1976. Initially available with side panels in finished hardwood or covered with black leathercloth, and black leathercloth covered front and rear panels (with no padding), the grille was thin aluminium perforated sheet which picks up dents rather easily. In 1973, a new grille was introduced - the same as the Sovereign III "family" - which was a heavy and thick aluminium extrusion. At some point afterwards, the handle is changed to a three-part unit that matches the rest of the Hacker range, and then towards the end of the run, the silver tone control knobs are replaced with black plastic versions. All versions of the Hunter have an FM band that is limited to 101 MHz (and non-switchable AFC).

The Hunter remains a popular set, despite its original "budget" status, and frequently achieves high sale prices on auction. The Elac loudspeaker provides a good audio performance, many enthusiasts preferring it over the various Sovereign sets.

=== Mayflower ===
In 1962, Hacker released the RV14 Mayflower; an FM-only valve table radio finished in striking veneers. Unusually for a Hacker, this set had coverage to 108 MHz - the FM front end was supplied by Görler. The audio sections were based around a pair of ECL86 triode/pentode valves that operated in push-pull, delivering around 7 watts in ultra-linear mode to a large (10 by 7 inch) loudspeaker. An EM84 "magic eye" tuning indicator valve was used.

The RV20 Mayflower II was released in 1963. This was electrically very similar, but had a very differently styled cabinet. The FM tuner was a different model that had reduced coverage to 104 MHz, but added an AFC function.

== Other products ==
Hacker made many mono record players, most of which could be converted to stereo with the purchase of a matching amplified loudspeaker; the GP15 Cavalier, GP42 Gondolier and GP45 Grenadier being commonly encountered examples. They also made a number of radiograms, and later music centres with matching loudspeakers and badge-engineered cassette decks from Japanese manufacturers including Sanyo and Nakamichi.

== See also ==
- Dynatron Radio Ltd
