= ThinkPad T60 =

Computer model by Lenovo

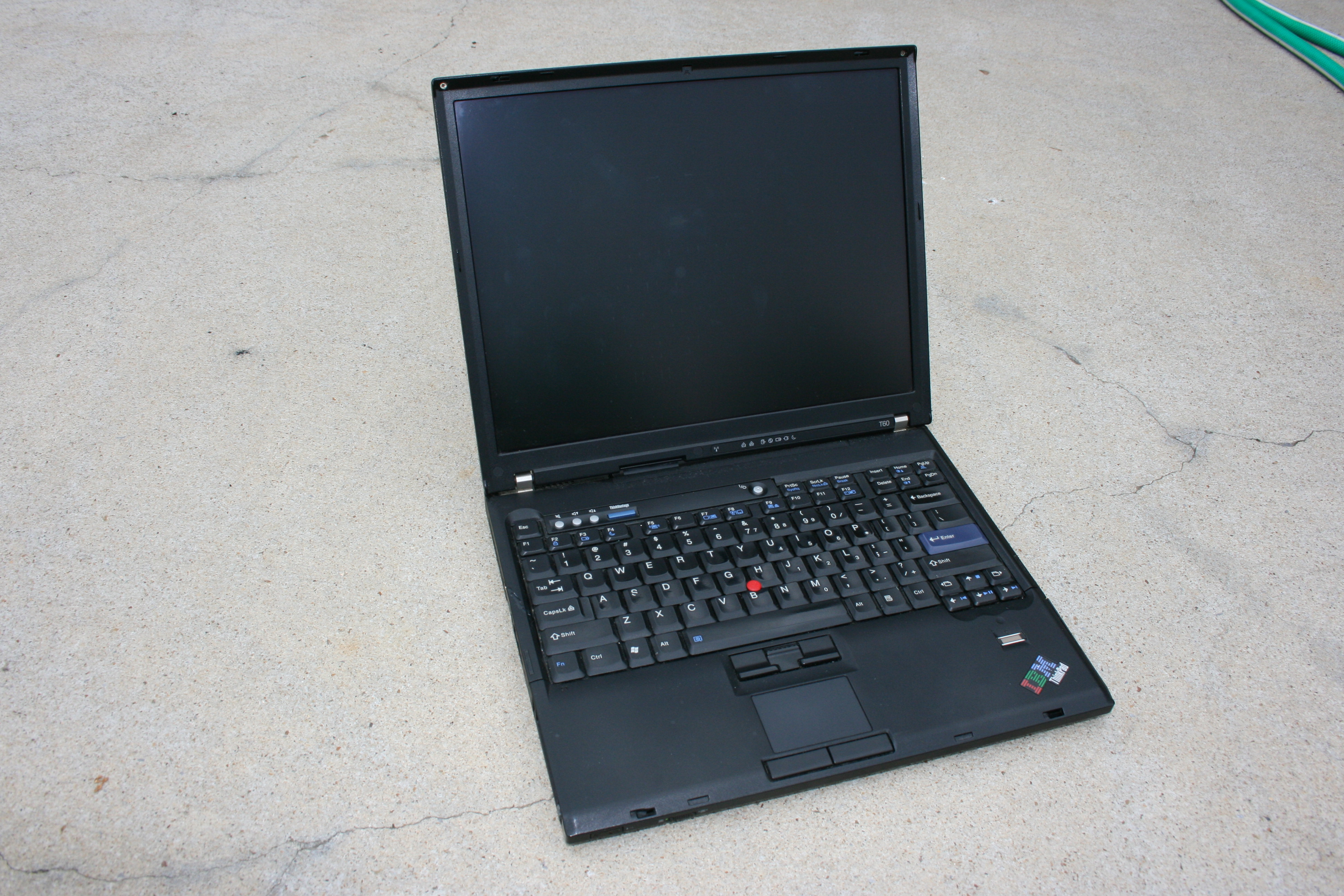
- ThinkPad T60 - 14" 4:3 version
- Manufacturer: Lenovo
- Product family: ThinkPad
- Type: Laptop
- Released: January 2006
- Predecessor: IBM ThinkPad T43
- Successor: ThinkPad T61

The ThinkPad T60 is a laptop that was manufactured by Lenovo.

== Hardware ==
This sub-line includes the basic T60 and associated p series (for performance; e.g., T60p). While designed and manufactured by Lenovo, the T60 and the T60p still featured the IBM logo on the machines.

The T60 and T60p can be initially ordered with 2 case options (the 14" 4:3 and 15" 4:3 models); the latest lineup includes an additional 15" 16:10 model with another motherboard layout (the motherboard of 4:3 models was compatible between 4:3-based cases).

The T60 is the first T-series ThinkPad to include the Mobile Intel Core Duo "Yonah" (and later the Intel Core 2 Duo "Merom") technology, and the first T-series ThinkPads to come with a widescreen resolution option. This model has a VMX-enabled BIOS, meaning that running fully virtualised operating systems via Xen or VMware is possible, provided a VMX compatible CPU is installed. 4 GB of DDR2 RAM can be provided, but only 3.25 GB would be visible - this was a chipset hardware limitation.

The keyboard for the T60 was manufactured by Chicony Electronics. The top cover of 14" model was made from magnesium composite (the 15" model has a PBRF plastic top cover), and all T60 ThinkPads have an internal magnesium frame.

== Accessories ==
All T60 versions supports ThinkPad UltraBay accessories (but SATA connection speed of bay was limited prior to IDE compatibility).

The docking station options includes an Advanced Mini-Dock (with 15 ports, include the DVI-D and RS-232 support) and Advanced Dock with additional PCI-E card support (with up to 1x bus speed).

== See also ==
- ThinkPad R60 - budget model
- ThinkPad X60 - portable (12") model

ThinkPad T series
Preceded by ThinkPad T43	ThinkPad T60	Succeeded by ThinkPad T61
Preceded by ThinkPad T43p	ThinkPad T60p	Succeeded by ThinkPad T61p
