= Moov (disambiguation) =

Moov may refer to:

- Moov, music streaming service
- Moov Africa, subsidiaries of Maroc Telecom
- Moov atom, part of MP4 file format;
  MooV/moov, type code or internal structure type (atom) of the QuickTime File Format
- Moov HD, former TV channel
