= Dynatron Radio =

Former manufacturer of radio equipment

Dynatron Radio Ltd was the trade name used by H.Hacker & Sons for their wireless products. The firm started trading in 1927 and operated independently until being bought by Ekco in 1955. The rights to the Dynatron name are currently held by Roberts Radio. Dynatron was also a successful business with making record players; most of them were made in the sixties and seventies. Priced in the pro-sumer market sector, the average household would have had to save the equivalent of three weeks salary to buy one.

== Early history ==
The Hacker brothers, Ron (born 1908) and Arthur (born 1910), shared a strong interest in radio, and started a company producing high quality radiograms and wireless receivers at the ages of just 19 and 17 respectively. As they were too young to become directors of a company, the firm was set up using their father's name, Harry Hacker, in 1927.

The firm began in a room above the family grocery shop on Maidenhead High Street, and the first product emerged in 1928 - the Dynatron U53 radiogram. A factory was built in the large rear garden of the family house "Little Gables" in Ray Lea Road in Maidenhead, measuring just 50 by 25 feet initially, but extended several times. In 1936, the company name was changed to Dynatron Radio Ltd.

The Hacker brothers always pursued the highest possible technical quality, and released designs incorporating many valves at a time when their competitors concentrated on reducing the number of valves in their products. For many years, they persisted with the tuned radio frequency receiver (TRF) principle, only adopting superheterodyne receiver (superhet) designs after some 10 years of development.

== World War II ==
During the Second World War, Dynatron contributed to the war effort on a not for profit basis, expanding the work force from around 70 employees to 160. The operation continued from the family home and expanded into a requisitioned factory, amounting to around 15,000 square feet of space. They produced airborne guidance systems such as Gee for the RAF, and after the war, Ron Hacker was awarded the M.B.E., though this was accepted with some reluctance as he felt that his brother also deserved the recognition.

== Post war period ==
After the war, austerity measures and component shortages caused the company significant difficulties. The Dynatron range had always been aimed at the top of the market, but achieving this in post-war times was always going to be problematic. In 1954, an offer from Ekco was accepted, and control was handed over in 1955. At the time, there were 150 employees, and a new factory in St. Peter's Road had just been built. The Hacker brothers were retained as joint Managing Directors, and the company was successful; by 1959 there were 250 employees.

However, the brothers decided to leave the group in September 1959 to start Hacker Radio Ltd. Shortly afterwards in 1960, Ekco merged with Pye, and then Pye was bought by Philips in 1967. During this time, Dynatron was moved from Maidenhead to King's Lynn. In 1981, Philips sold Dynatron to Roberts Radio. During the 1980s, Roberts, a company already marketing portable radios at the premium end of the market sector, used the Dynatron brand for lower-end portable radios and clock-radios. This tactic was needed in order to prevent Dynatron and Roberts products from competing against each other in the same market sector, but it also very much cheapened the image of the brand. Roberts manufactured the last Dynatron-branded radios in the late 1980s. Since then the brand has been in a state of permanent hiatus.
