= Venucia T60 =

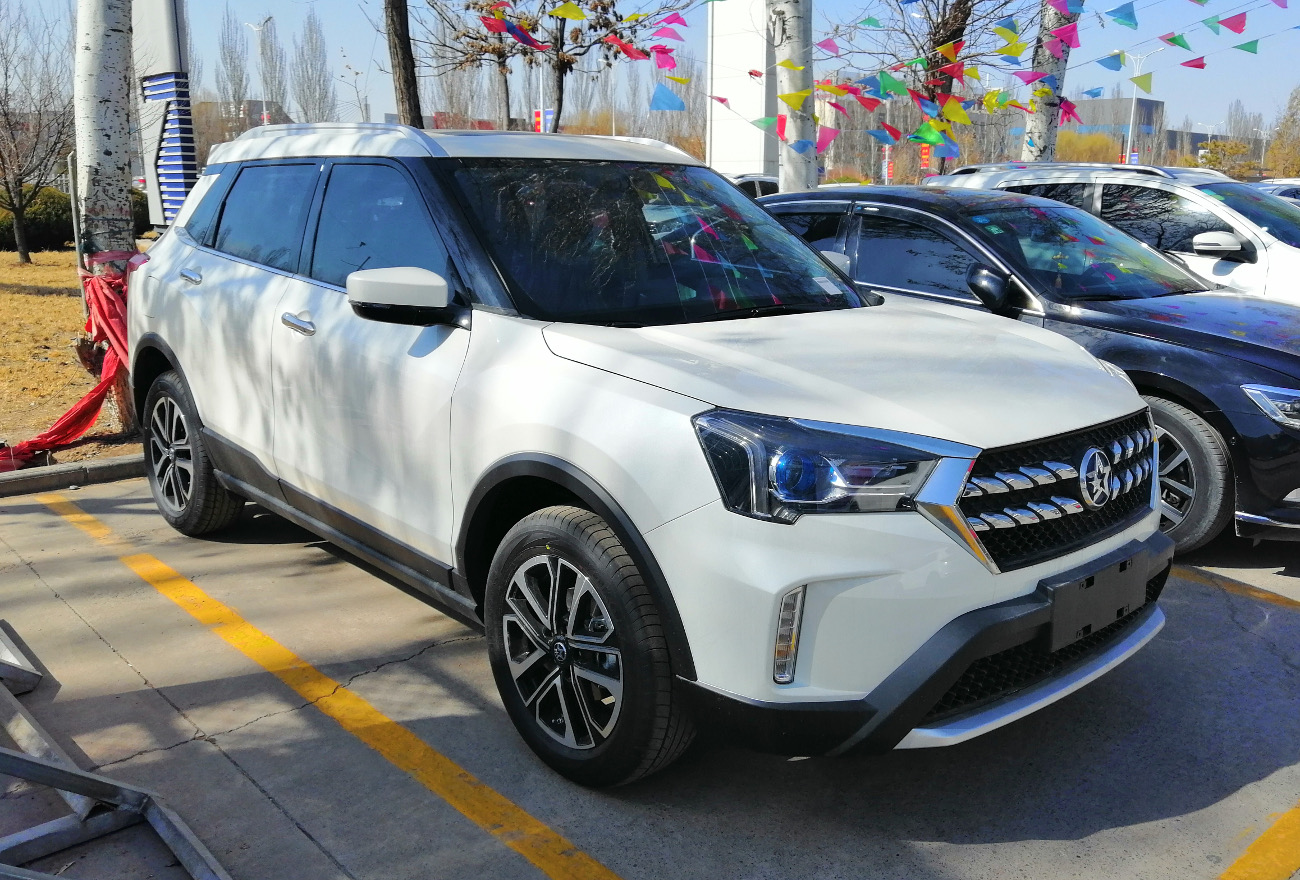

Overview
- Manufacturer: Venucia (Dongfeng Nissan)
- Production: 2018–present
- Assembly: Wuhan, China (Dongfeng Venucia Motor Company)

Body and chassis
- Body style: 5-door hatchback
- Layout: Front-engine, front-wheel-drive
- Related: Mitsubishi Outlander

Powertrain
- Engine: 1.6 L HR16 I4 (petrol); 1.8 L I4 (petrol)
- Electric motor: Permanent magnet synchronous
- Power output: 163 PS; 161 hp (120 kW)
- Transmission: 5-speed manual XTRONIC CVT automatic Single gear (T60EV)
- Battery: 60.7 kWh Li-ion

Dimensions
- Wheelbase: 2,640 mm (103.9 in)
- Length: 4,412 mm (173.7 in)
- Width: 1,820 mm (71.7 in)
- Height: 1,679 mm (66.1 in)

The Venucia T60 is a subcompact crossover SUV produced by the Chinese car manufacturer Venucia since 2018.

== Overview ==
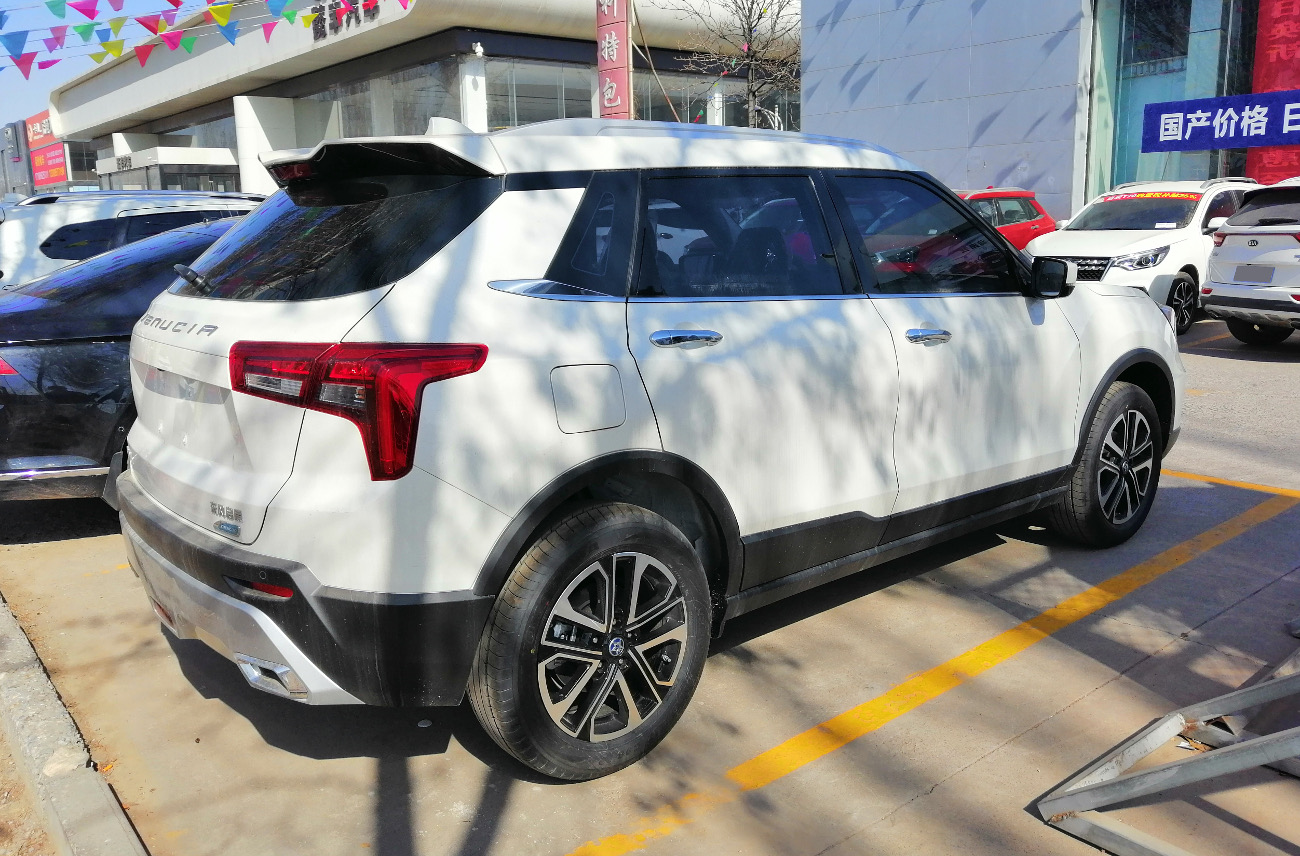
Venucia T60 rear view

The Venucia T60 was launched on to the Chinese auto market during the 2018 Guangzhou Auto Show in November 2018 with a price range from 85,800 yuan to 118,800 yuan.

The Venucia T60 is powered by a Nissan-sourced 1.6 liter engine producing 126 hp (93 kW) and 154N·m mated to a CVT.

== Venucia T60EV ==
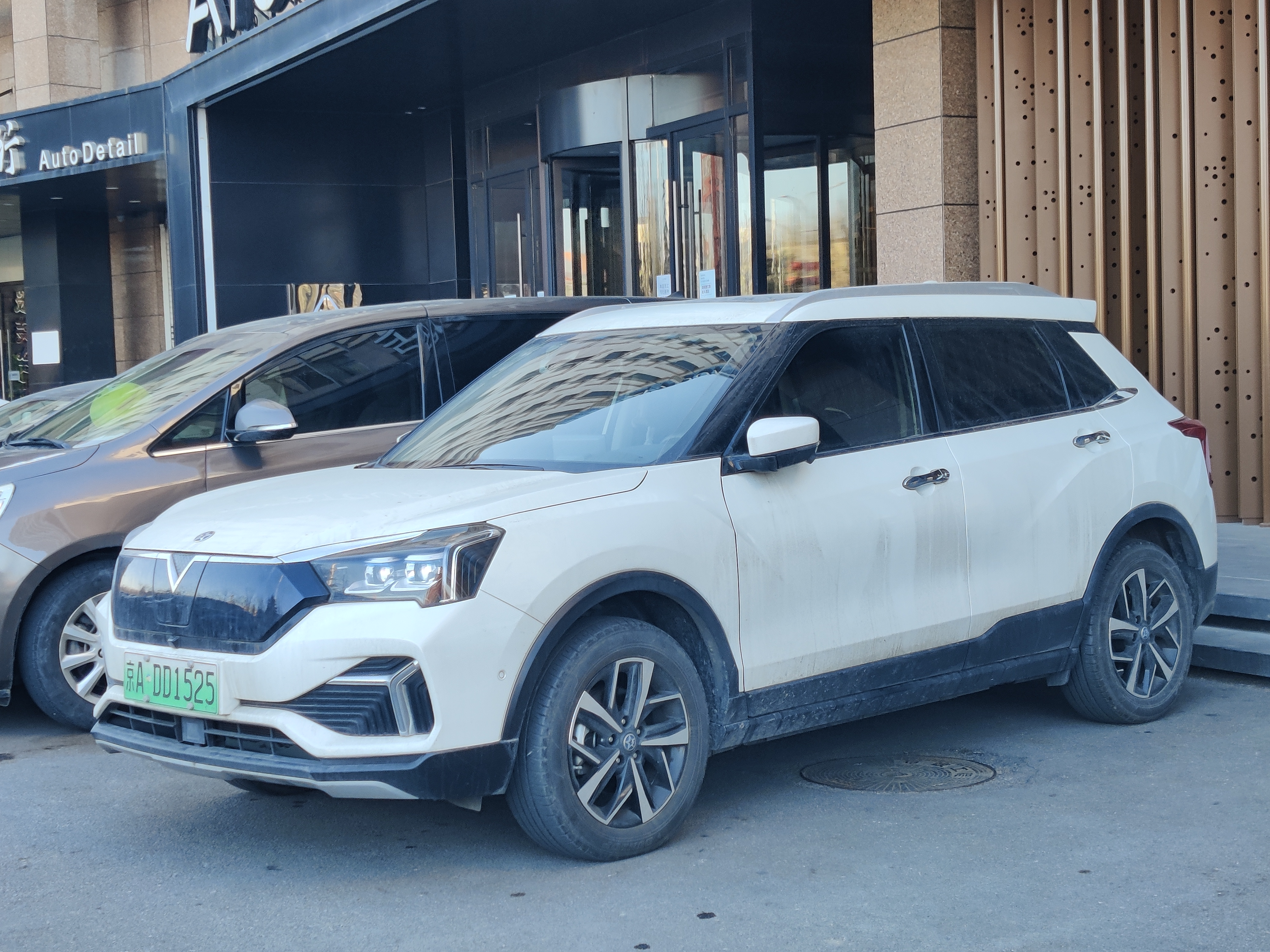

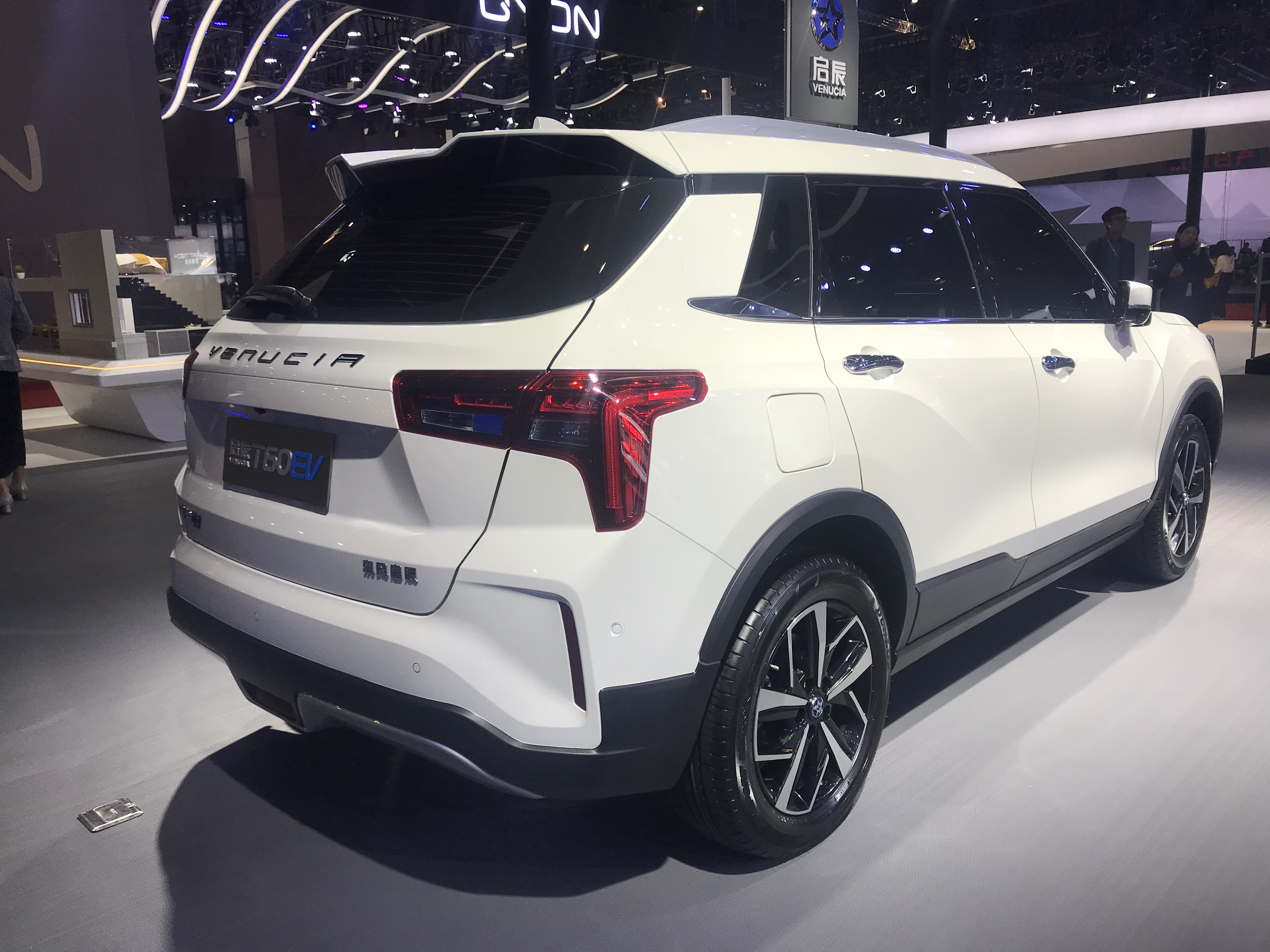
Venucia T60EV

The Venucia T60EV is the electric version of the Venucia T60 crossover. It was revealed during the 2019 Shanghai Auto Show alongside the D60EV electric sedan.

The Venucia T60 EV is equipped with a 60.7 kWh battery delivering an NEDC range of 442 km (276 miles). The Venucia T60s drivetrain produces 120 kW (161 hp) and 250 N.m (184 lb.ft) of torque and a top speed of 125 km/h / 78 mph. The energy consumption of the Venucia T60 EV is 14.7 kWh/100 km.

== Sales ==
Year	China		
Year	T60	EV	Total
2023	1,649	611	2,260
2024	1	608	609
2025	—	25	25
