= Bloom.fm =

Former music application and streaming service

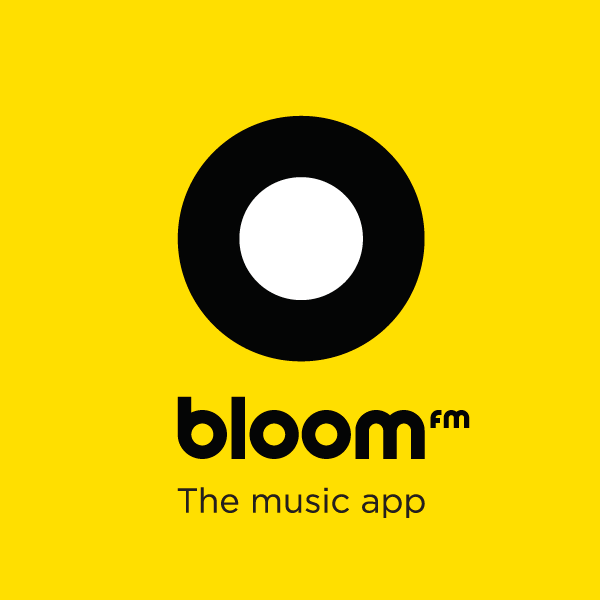
- Developer: Digital Distribution Networks Ltd.
- Initial release: iOS (8 January 2013; 12 years ago); Android (3 September 2013; 12 years ago)
- Stable release: 1.2.3130 (iOS); 1.0.1640 (Android); /: iOS (12 September 2013; 12 years ago); Android (13 September 2013; 12 years ago)
- Operating system: iOS 4.3 or later; Android 2.3 or later
- Size: 1.6 to 4.5 MB
- Available in: English
- Type: Music online service
- License: Freemium
- Website: www.bloom.fm
- As of: 16 September 2013

Bloom.fm was a London-based mobile-focused music service which combined free streaming genre and artist based radios, music discovery tools, a local library player and a catalogue of over 22 million tracks. The service allowed users to 'borrow' songs, making them available for offline playback. The maximum number of stored tracks was determined by the subscription level.

Bloom was only available in the United Kingdom on iOS and Android. A Web version was supposedly in development and originally set for release at some point in 2013, but it was never made available to the general public. On 30 April 2014, the owners of Bloom.fm, Digital Distribution Networks, announced that they were to shut down, due to lack of funding.

== History ==
After the closure of mflow in 2012, the company rebranded and pivoted towards mobile and on-demand streaming. According to Bloom.fm co-founder and CTO/CPO, Thong Nguyen, the rebrand reflected a clean fresh start for the company and its new focus on mobile.

Bloom.fm was officially launched in January 2013 on iOS, previously being available to several thousand beta testers. The iOS App was followed by an Android version in September 2013.

The service reached 250,000 registered users in August 2013, growing to 1 million users by March 2014.

== Features ==
=== Catalogue ===
As of September 2013, approximately 22 million tracks were available on the service, including content from EMI, Sony, Universal, and Merlin (representing over 120,000 independent labels) and various independent labels through aggregators such as TuneCore, IODA, The Orchard, PIAS, AWAL, Ditto, and CD Baby.

Warner Music was the only major label not to have licensed its content to the service.

=== Radio ===
The free tier of the service offered over 150 genre-based radios. Additionally, users were able to start a new radio based on most artists on the service.

=== Borrowing ===
Bloom.fm referred to the process of caching the track on a device as ‘borrowing’. This allowed offline and on-demand playback and additionally served as the basis for pricing tiers. Borrowed tracks were available to users for the duration of the subscription.

=== Discovery ===
The artist discovery interface allowed the user to recursively explore related artists by tapping the icon in the bottom left of the player.

=== Playlists ===
Playlists of two types were available to all paying consumers. Normal playlists were created by manually adding borrowed tracks to them and smart playlists were created automatically by borrowing tracks from the predefined radio channels.

=== Local content ===
The application supported integration and playback of local music libraries. This feature was available for free on all tiers. The company expressed a desire for the app to become the default music player for all users.

=== Pricing ===
The service offered a free tier (Bloom Zero) that gave the user access to streaming genre radio channels as well as artist-based radios.

The service was noted for a low entry price point with tiers determining the number of tracks a user could store on their devices or play on demand.

The entry-level £1 tier (Bloom 20) allowed the user to borrow and store 20 tracks, the £5 tier (Bloom 200) had an allowance of 200 tracks and the £10 tier (Full Bloom) allowed unlimited streaming and borrowing.

On the entry level tiers only tracks that were borrowed could be played offline or on-demand but users were permitted to swap borrowed tracks as often as they liked. The company hoped these pricing tiers would convert customers who were previously unwilling to pay for music.

Notably, the subscription prices were different on the website of the service and Apple's iOS App Store. The company explained the higher prices in the App Store by stating that Apple took a 30% cut of in-app purchases.

	Radio	Discovery	Free of ads	Playlist	Streaming	Borrowing	Monthly cost
Bloom Zero	Yes	Yes	No	No	No	No	Free
Bloom 20	Yes	Yes	Yes	Yes	No	20 tracks	£1/£1.49
Bloom 200	Yes	Yes	Yes	Yes	No	200 tracks	£5/£6.99
Full Bloom	Yes	Yes	Yes	Yes	Yes	Unlimited tracks	£10/£13.99

=== Other versions and platforms ===
According to CEO Oleg Fomenko, several other versions were in active development, including dedicated iPad and web apps.

=== Third-party service integration and sharing ===
Bloom.fm allowed the user to use their Facebook account to log into the app. Tracks could be shared to Twitter and Facebook with an option to share via email. Directly sharing from device to device was also possible using the phone camera and on-screen QR code.

The service also supported scrobbling to Last.fm on the iPhone app.

== Partnerships ==
The company partnered with music events in the UK, including The Liverpool Sound City, Tramlines Festival, and Toddla T Sound.

== Administration ==
On 30 April 2014, Bloom.fm announced on their blog that their main investor, TNT Media Investments, had pulled out. On 2 May, administrators Moorfields Corporate Recovery published a Press Release urging for the sale of Bloom.fm by 9 May, however no sale was finalised. Operations were ceased in the following days, which were managed by Moorfields. After the administration, Bloom.fm offered users access to Tesco's Blinkbox. Bloom.fm co-founder and CEO, Oleg Fomenko, went on to co-found health & fitness startup Sweatcoin
