= ThinkPad T61 =

Laptop model

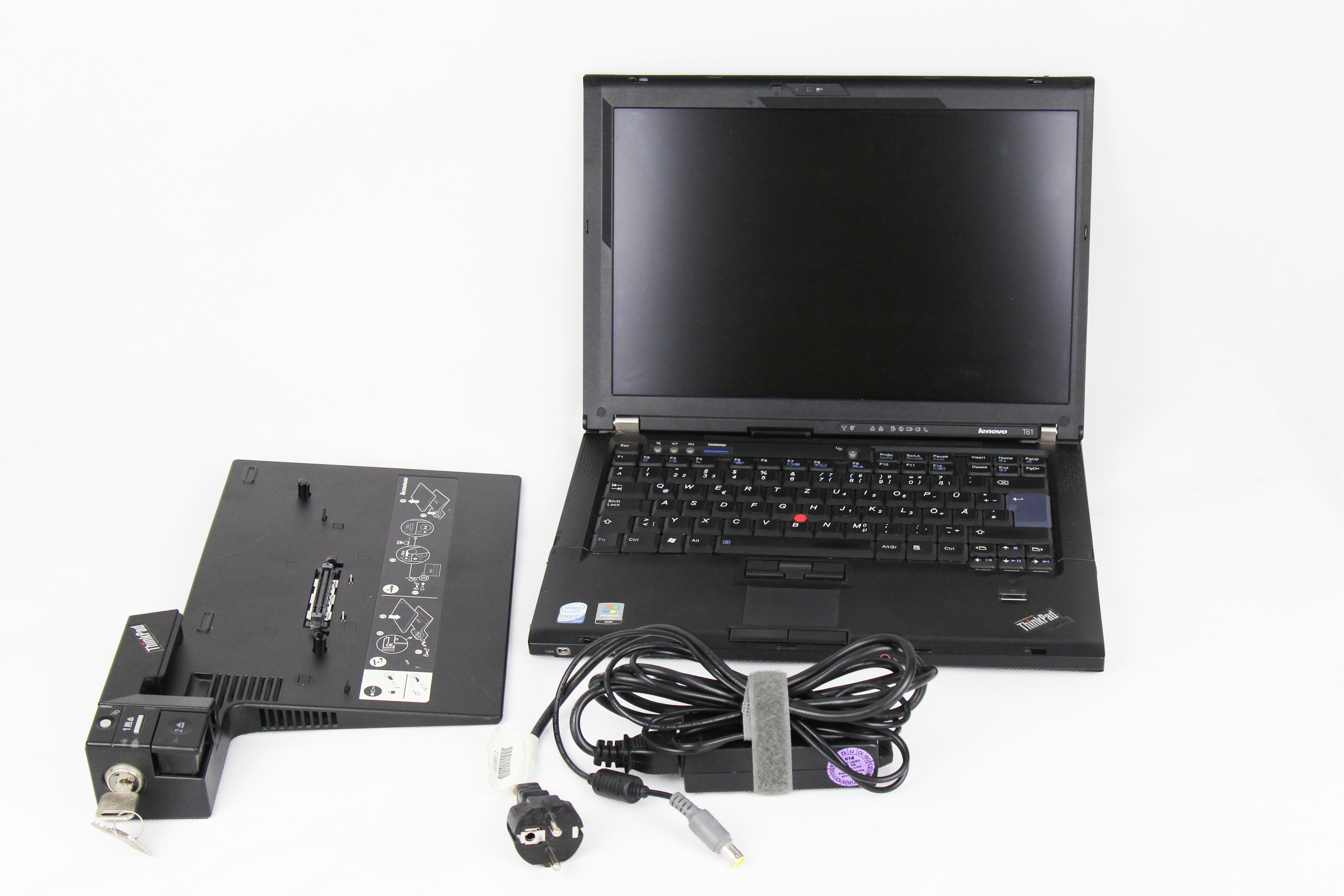
- ThinkPad T61 with docking station
- Manufacturer: Lenovo
- Product family: ThinkPad T series
- Operating system: Windows Vista
- Predecessor: ThinkPad T60
- Successor: ThinkPad T400, ThinkPad T500, ThinkPad W500

The ThinkPad T61 was a high-end, business-class laptop computer manufactured by Lenovo. The T61 was part of the T series, which was first manufactured in 2006. It was offered as a modular platform. One could customize the processor speed, RAM, hard disk storage, screen and video card of the laptop. There were also additional capabilities such as a fingerprint reader, smart card reader, and zip drive. The T61 came with the Windows Vista operating system.

ThinkPad T series
Preceded by ThinkPad T60	ThinkPad T61	Succeeded by ThinkPad T400; ThinkPad T500
Preceded by ThinkPad T60p	ThinkPad T61p	Succeeded by ThinkPad W500
