= Lola T61 =

Open-wheel Formula Two racing car

- Category: Formula Two
- Constructor: Lola
- Designer(s): Eric Broadley

Technical specifications
- Chassis: Glass-fiber reinforced plastic panels bodywork, aluminum monocoque
- Suspension: Double wishbones, telescopic shock absorbers, co-axial coil springs, anti-roll bar
- Axle track: 53 in (1,346.2 mm) (front and rear)
- Wheelbase: 88 in (2,235.2 mm)
- Engine: Ford-Cosworth SCA 1.0 L (61.0 cu in) I4 naturally-aspirated Mid-engined
- Transmission: Hewland Mk.5 6-speed manual
- Power: 120 hp (89 kW)
- Weight: 420 kg (926 lb)

Competition history

The Lola T61 was an open-wheel Formula Two racing car, designed, developed, and built by British manufacturer Lola Cars in 1966.

The Lola T61 was a greatly improved version of the 1965 Lola T60. The car was built for the British Midland Racing Partnership Formula Two team. The season was marked by the superiority of the Brabham racing cars, which started with either Honda or Cosworth engines and won all the races of the year. The Lola T61 and the new Matra racing cars filled the starting fields. Fourth place for David Hobbs in the Formula 2 race in Barcelona in 1966 remained the best finish for a T61 in this racing class.
