= Mflow =

Music streaming service

mflow
- Developer: Digital Distribution Networks
- Initial release: 2008; 18 years ago
- Written in: C++, HTML5, JavaScript, C# and ASP.NET
- Available in: English
- Type: Music Streaming and Social Networking
- Licence: Proprietary commercial software
- Website: www.mflow.com

mflow was an online social music streaming, recommendation, and mp3-retailing service. It allowed users to search, stream, and recommend music free of charge.

== Company background ==
=== History ===
Founded in 2008, mflow was a social music-sharing and downloading service, developed by Digital Distribution Networks in London.

The service was first launched as a limited beta, open only to invited users in December 2009. The first iteration of the service was a software client that ran on users' machines. In August 2010, mflow started developing an HTML5-based internet application. On December 3, 2010, mflow launched the first beta version of their web-based service with an expanded feature list.

=== Music sales and rewards system ===
Uniquely, mflow rewarded users for recommending music. 20% of the retail price of tracks and albums sold on mflow were redistributed back to the recommending user(s) as “mflow credits”.

=== Catalogue ===
As of January 2011, mflow had a catalogue of approximately five million tracks. Label partners included: Universal, Sony, PIAS, Beggars, Ingrooves, Skint Records, Domino Recordings, Ministry of Sound, IODA, and many more.

== Closure ==
As of January 2012, the site was closed for business. A message on the company's home page stated: "Over the past few months we've been working on a top-secret new project... we can't share this grown-up mflow with you until we're confident it's better than anything you've used before." It was later revealed the site would be closed for good to make way for a new mobile streaming app titled Bloom.fm.

Directed by Thong Nguyen and Oleg Fomenko, the company posted public accounts in 2010 recording total liabilities of £7.6 million, and -£5.4M in net assets.
