= T3 (magazine) =

British technology magazine

- Cover of the September 2024 issue (UK)
- Editor: Nick Odantzis, editor (Magazine), Mat Gallagher, editor-in-chief (T3.com)
- Categories: Technology, Gadgets
- Frequency: Monthly
- Circulation: 52,979 (ABC Jul–Dec 2013); Print and digital editions.
- First issue: 3 September 1996
- Company: Future plc
- Country: United Kingdom
- Language: English
- Website: www.t3.com
- ISSN: 1364-2642

T3 magazine is a UK-based lifestyle technology magazine, which specialises in premium and aspirational products, ranging from phones and TVs to fitness, outdoor, wellness, watches and style.

Originally, T3 stood for Tomorrow's Technology Today, but this is not used anywhere in the magazine or on the website anymore except for on the side of the magazine. It is exclusively referred to as T3 or T3.com. The magazine is popular but in terms of sales is ranked second among UK gadget magazines. T3 magazine is available in most countries, and has syndicated/localised versions in over 20 countries.

== T3.com (T3 Website) ==
The T3 website (T3.com) started off as a running advertisement for the magazine, but that has changed quite radically over time. The website now has a large team of staff members separate from T3 magazine, and it operates as a publication in its own right.

T3.com now creates a lot of reviews exclusively for the website, in addition to staying on top of gadget and technology stories as they happen. The current editor-inchief for T3.com is Mat Gallagher, with section editors Matt Kollat, Beth Girdler-Maslen, and Mike Lowe.

== History ==
The first issue of T3 magazine went on sale in October 1996. The magazine was a spin-off of a science magazine eventually launched as Frontiers, but the publishers decided to have a look at future technology. The reasoning was that there wasn't really an all-round consumer technology magazine in the UK market and that people love reading about technology and gadgets.

The magazine started off as a celebration of the best new technologies that were appearing, to explain how it all works, and how the technologies and products would impact the readers' lives, but evolved into a glossy entertainment magazine as well. Many of the readers started buying the magazine specifically to read about items that were outrageously expensive and outlandish, and the magazine was quickly seen as a 'licence to drool' over bleeding-edge technology. The first issue of the magazine featured the first DVD player to be imported into the UK.

Things started to become digital around 1996 - DECT telephones, digital cameras, PDAs, and later DVD and digital television technology. With most technology going digital and dropping in price, general interest for gadgets rose, as did sales of the magazine.

Ultimately, the magazine started moving away from pure technology coverage, and started writing about anything innovative. As the editor at the time said: "A slightly bigger TV, for example, wouldn't go in the magazine unless it was really sexy or had clever features". Around the same time, the magazine became less geeky in its approach to technology, and became much more of a magazine for design-conscious gadget-loving men.

The first editor of T3 magazine was Steve Jarratt, who also launched Edge. He was followed by Paul Pettengale, Rob Mead, Mark Higham, James Beechinor-Collins, Michael Brook, Luke Peters, Matt Hill, Tom Dennis, Rob Carney, Matt Bolton and Josh Russell. The current editor is Nick Odantzis.

== Syndication ==
The magazine logo as it appears on the front page

T3 is a franchise that has local versions in a whole series of countries. The localised versions vary from country to country: Some editions are completely new magazines, created by a local team of journalists and designers under the T3 brand. Other syndications are adaptations of the UK version for a local market, or region (the T3 Middle East franchise, for instance). T3 magazine used to feature cover girls but has since stopped the practise.

Most syndicated versions of T3 magazine are a hybrid of both T3 UK content (both editorial and pictorial), and content geared towards local markets, with reviews of companies, services, and items relevant especially to the national market.

In October 2009, syndicated editions included Australia, China, Croatia, Czech Republic, Denmark, Dubai, Greece, Indonesia, Italy, Lebanon, Malaysia, Mexico, Philippines, Poland, Portugal, Russia, Saudi Arabia, Serbia, Singapore, South Africa, Thailand, Turkey, Ukraine and United Arab Emirates.

Apart from separate magazines, T3's stories often appear in major newspapers, and the T3 staff are frequently featured on radio and television as industry experts. Articles are also syndicated in the technology section of the O2 Active portal.

== See also ==
- Stuff - T3's closest magazine competitor in the UK
- Engadget - Large gadget blog
- Gizmodo - Large gadget blog
- The Gadget Show - popular weekly TV show
