= Musicovery =

Interactive webradio service

- Screenshot of Musicovery in use.
- Website type: Internet radio
- Website: musicovery.com
- Registration: Optional
- Current status: Offline

Musicovery is an interactive and customised French webradio service. Listeners rate songs, resulting in a personalized programme. Reviewers have commented that unlike services that are governed by the user's choice of artist or genre, this method results in more discovery of artists to which the user might not otherwise have been exposed; The Washington Post's reviewer gave the example of "segueing from a West Coast R&B band to a folk–rock group from Algeria".

Musicovery provides dance mix — with the ability to specify the desired dance tempo — and similar artist features, as well as the option of a low fidelity free service or a premium service with better sound. Users have the option to limit the selection to a specific year or range of years, as well as to deselect any genre, and genres are color-keyed to the graphic interface. At least one U.S. newspaper reported that major advertising agency JWT listed Musicovery on its 2007 list of "80 things to watch in 2008," a list of trends and new products and services; however, the article does not indicate whether the agency had any business relationship with companies on the list. The webradio service is accessible on mobile phone (on 3G/Symbian Nokia Devices) iPhone and iPod Touch.

Music files provided by the service are streamed, not downloaded, and the listener can buy all the songs played or tagged as favorite from major online music retailers iTunes, Amazon, and eBay.

== Announcement ==
On January 2, 2017, Musicovery announced on Facebook that it has closed its webradio, and is currently only working as B2B in supplying playlists to other streaming services.

We are sad to announce to our users that Musicovery is closing its smart radio. Musicovery is now focusing on providing to other music services its recommendation and playlist engine. We thank all listeners for their support. We hope you enjoyed the trip!

== History ==
Musicovery was founded by French programmers Vincent Castaignet and Frédéric Vavrille. They combined their technology in January 2006 to create the internet site Musicovery.com. Castaignet has created the "Mood pad", a proprietary technology enabling listeners to find intuitively music matching their mood (see Technology). Vavrille is the creator of Liveplasma.com, a graphic discovery engine. Liveplasma was created in 2004 and is a graphical interface based on Liveplasma technology. The Liveplasma technology creates a graphical map of possible tastes, with songs most likely to please the user appearing closer to the current song on the visual map than songs less similar.

Musicovery webradio was beta-tested in June 2006 and launched in November 2006.

After four years, a completely redesigned Musicovery website was launched in July 2010. The new version does not feature Liveplasma technology, and has many fewer features available in the free version of the site.

An iPhone application was launched in September 2010.

In January 2017 Musicovery closed its services to end-users and is now only supplying playlists to other streaming providers.

The Musicovery team is based in Paris, France.

== Technology ==
Musicovery relies on proprietary technology developed by its founders:

- The "mood pad" technology: a music description methodology that enables to position any song on a 2 dimension continuous space (the “mood pad”); songs are described with 40 musical parameters; The technology is the result of 3-year research on music description and human acoustic perception.

The streaming music is at low quality 32 kbit/s on the free platform, and at good quality 128 kbit/s on the paid platform.

== International service ==
The music catalogs are specific for each country and the site is translated in local languages (English, Spanish, Portuguese, Italian, German, and French). The interface is adapted to local specifications where appropriate (for instance, country and folk genres are added for the US audience). The popularity scale of each song, a parameter influencing music programming, is specific to each country.

While critics generally have praised the site's graphic interface, ability to make unusual but fitting song suggestions, and innovation in using mood as a grouping strategy, one otherwise favorable review complained of the "limited overall title base". Another reviewer noted that the technology used to classify each song by mood had its limitations, observing that the service "persists in, for example, believing that "Crazy Frog" puts me in a good mood, whereas this techno air instead gives me a death wish."

== Premium Features ==
- Skipping
  - Banning a song skips it automatically
  - Songs can also be skipped by removing them from the map
- High quality audio
- Play only favorite songs
- Play any song on the map at any time
- No ads
- Access artist and song info

== Additional references ==
- Francesca Steele. "The Web Watcher: Hillary Clinton as Rocky Balboa; Musicovery," The Times (London), April 23, 2008. Retrieved 2008-07-01.
- Minutes – http://www.20minutes.fr/article/217964/High-Tech-Pratique-Musicovery-est-une-webradio-interactive-gratuite-et-en-francais-Cette-application-est-utilisable-La-version-gratuite-est-financee.php
- Brad Kava. "Take your pick! Our critics pick the best bets for Dec. 17–23," San Jose Mercury News (CA), December 17, 2006, page 3C.
- Jenn Kistler. "From the editor: Discover more music," Las Cruces Sun-News (NM), December 19, 2007, Pulse section.
- Steve Woodward. "Personal Tech/Playlists: Log on and listen up: Song suggestions for you," The Oregonian (Portland, OR), February 23, 2007, Living section, page E1.
