= USS Summit County =

1945 LST-542-class tank landing ship

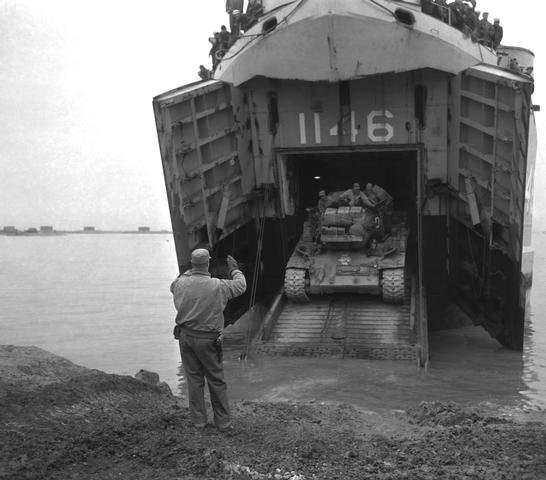
- USS LST-1146 unloading a tank at Inchon, Korea.

History

United States
- Name: Summit County
- Namesake: Summit County, Colorado; Summit County, Ohio; Summit County, Utah
- Laid down: 10 February 1945
- Launched: 11 May 1945
- Commissioned: 30 May 1945
- Decommissioned: March, 1946
- Reinstated: 21 December 1965
- Decommissioned: 1969
- Fate: Sold to Ecuador, 14 February 1977
- Stricken: 1 November 1976
- Honors and awards: one battle star, Korean War; three battle stars, Vietnam War

History

Ecuador
- Name: BAE Hualcopo (T-55)
- Acquired: 14 February 1977
- Reclassified: T-61
- Reclassified: TR-61
- Status: in active service, as of 2007

General characteristics
- Class & type: LST-542-class tank landing ship
- Displacement: 1,490 tons (light); 4,080 tons (full load of 2,100 tons)
- Length: 328 ft (100 m)
- Beam: 50 ft (15 m)
- Draft: 8 ft (2.4 m) forward; 14 ft 4 in (4.37 m) aft (full load)
- Propulsion: Two diesel engines, two shafts
- Speed: 10.8 knots (20 km/h) (max); 9 knots (17 km/h) (econ)
- Complement: 7 officers, 204 enlisted
- Armament: 8 × 40 mm guns; 12 × 20 mm guns

USS Summit County (LST-1146) was an LST-542-class tank landing ship in the United States Navy. Unlike many of her class, which received only numbers and were disposed of after World War II, she survived long enough to be named. On 1 July 1955, all LSTs still in commission were named for US counties or parishes; LST-1146 was given the name Summit County, after counties in Colorado, Ohio and Utah. She was decommissioned in 1969 and placed in reserve. She was sold to Ecuador and renamed BAE Hualcopo (T-55). Although she suffered a major fire in July 1998, she was still in service with the Ecuadorian Navy as of 2007 under her current pennant number of TR-61.

== U.S. Navy career ==
LST-1146 was laid down on 10 February 1945 at Seneca, Illinois, by the Chicago Bridge & Iron Co.; launched on 11 May 1945, sponsored by Mrs. Margaret L. Hecht Jr.; and commissioned on 30 May 1945.

Following World War II, LST-1146 performed occupation duty in the Far East until mid-November 1945. After occupation duty, LST-1146 operated off the west coast of the United States for the next five years, principally occupied with resupply missions for Alaskan ports. During the Korean War, her resupply efforts were shifted to Korean ports. During the Korean War, LST 1146 was modified to transport the much needed, but the slow and short range LSU pigback where it would then drop the LSU in the water sideways. On 1 July 1955, she was redesignated Summit County (LST-1146) after counties in Colorado, Ohio, and Utah. From 1965 into 1969, Summit County saw extensive service in the Vietnam theater. She was transferred to the United States Maritime Administration in December 1969 and assigned to the Pacific Reserve Fleet at Suisun Bay, California. Summit County was sold to Ecuador on 14 February 1977.

LST-1146 earned one battle star for the Korean War and three battle stars for the Vietnam War.

== Ecuadorian Navy career ==
On 14 February 1977 Summit County was sold to Ecuador under the terms of the Security Assistance Program. She was renamed BAE Hualcopo (T-55), but later successively assigned pennant numbers T-61 and TR-61. Hualcopo suffered a major fire in July 1998 and, as a result, is in poor condition and perhaps non-operational. Nevertheless, as of 2007, she remained in service with the Ecuadorian Navy.
