= Thesixtyone =

thesixtyone
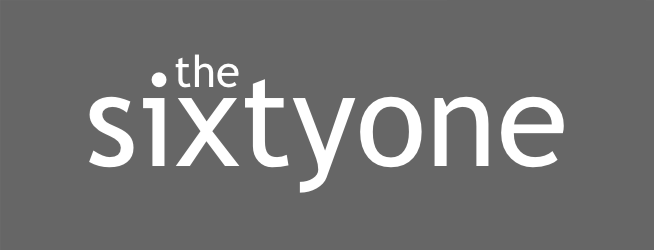
- Website type: Music
- Creators: James Miao, Samuel Hsiung
- Website: www.thesixtyone.com
- Current status: Closed
- Content license: Creative Commons (dependent on uploader)

thesixtyone (t61) was a streaming media website that used collaborative filtering to organize, promote, and sell music uploaded by artists, many of whom are independent musicians. The site was founded by James Miao and Samuel Hsiung and received early investment from Paul Graham. It was released in alpha from January 2008 and received additional funding from Creative Commons CEO Joi Ito and Reid Hoffman, founder of LinkedIn.

The site takes its name from Highway 61, a route with deep connections to American music culture. According to the site's "bazaar" where users can purchase songs or mp3 albums uploaded by artists, "thesixtyone's guiding principle is to enable the creative middle class, providing talented artists the opportunity to make a living making music." The site also allows artists to license their music under Creative Commons licenses and allow free downloads.

On January 20, 2010, thesixtyone implemented a new design with emphasis on high resolution photography, location, and lyrics. The new layout sparked controversy among some users, leading them to direct their displeasure on the website's Facebook page. Many of the most active users prior to the redesign also quit using the site.

On January 1, 2016, thesixyone cofounder Samuel Hsiung seemingly accepted that the redesign had been a mistake in a site announcement, apologized for recent neglect and reverted to the site design before the controversial changes.

In April 2017, the site was updated with a message that thesixtyone was shutting down, and that servers would go offline at midnight on May 1, 2017.

"To our faithful listeners,

We've decided to formally shutdown thesixtyone.com -- our servers will go offline at midnight, May 1st 2017.

Artist tipping and music purchases will be functional until then, so please spend any remaining credits by month's end. A final payment will be made to artists following the shutdown. thesixtyone was our baby for most of our twenties. We're incredibly sorry we weren't able to keep things going in the right direction. 2007-2017 Thank you for being a part of it. Farewell,

James Miao & Samuel Hsiung"
