= ThinkPad T43 =

Laptop computer by IBM and Lenovo

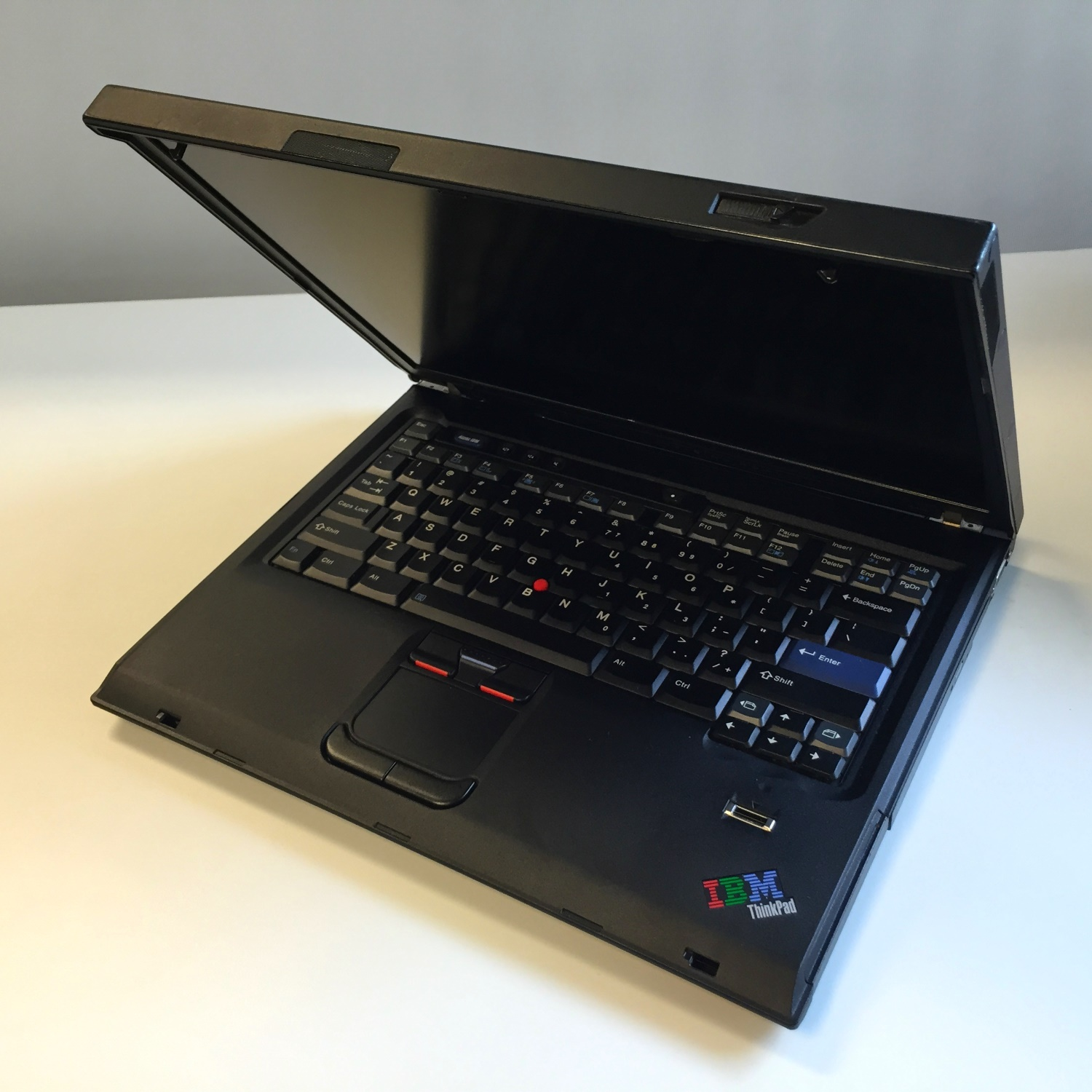
- A ThinkPad T43 laptop
- Manufacturer: IBM
- Type: Laptop
- Released: 2004
- Discontinued: 2005
- CPU: Intel Pentium M
- Memory: Up to 2GB DDR2
- Storage: 40GB; 100GB HDD
- Display: 14.1-inch TFT display
- Graphics: ATI Mobility Radeon X300 or X300SE
- Connectivity: Wi-Fi; Bluetooth; Ethernet; Modem; 2 USB 2.0; VGA; S-Video; PC Card slot
- Dimensions: 31.6 cm × 25.9 cm × 2.9 cm (12.4 in × 10.2 in × 1.1 in)
- Weight: 2.3 kg (5.1 lb)
- Made in: Mexico: Guadalajara, Jalisco (Guadalajara Plant); United States: Research Triangle Park, North Carolina (RTP Plant; low-volume production only); Japan: Fujisawa, Kanagawa (Fujisawa Plant); United Kingdom: Greenock, Scotland (Greenock Plant); China: Shenzhen, Guangdong (IIPC)

The ThinkPad T43 is a laptop computer manufactured by IBM. It was released in 2004 and discontinued in 2005. It was the last ThinkPad laptop that was designed and manufactured by IBM.

== Specifications ==
The ThinkPad T43 features an Intel Pentium M processor, ATI Mobility Radeon X300 or X300SE graphics, and a 14.1-inch TFT display. It supports up to 2GB of DDR2 memory and storage options ranging from 40GB to 100GB HDD.

== Connectivity ==
Connectivity options include Wi-Fi, Bluetooth, Ethernet, and modem. The laptop is equipped with various ports including 2 USB 2.0 ports, a parallel port, VGA, S-Video, and a PC Card slot.

== Operating System Support ==
The ThinkPad T43 originally shipped with Windows XP but also supports, Linux and BSD distributions.

== Dimensions and Weight ==
The laptop measures 31.6 cm × 25.9 cm × 2.9 cm (12.4 in × 10.2 in × 1.1 in) and weighs approximately 2.3 kg (5.1 lb).

== Legacy ==
The ThinkPad T43 was praised for its durability, keyboard quality, and overall performance. It remains a popular choice among vintage laptop enthusiasts.
