= Roberts Radio =

British radio manufacturer

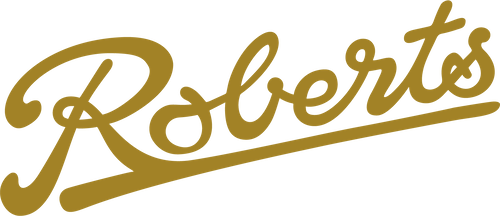
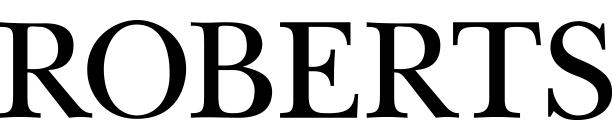
- The Roberts logo (Revival version); the Roberts wordmark
- Company type: Subsidiary
- Industry: Consumer electronics
- Founded: 1932; 94 years ago London, England
- Headquarters: Chertsey, Surrey, England
- Key people: Owen Watters (Chief Executive Officer)
- Products: Audio & Video equipment
- Owner: GlenDimplex
- Website: www.robertsradio.com

Roberts Radio Limited is a British consumer electronics company that produces radio receivers including digital and internet radios, as well as related audio equipment. Based in Chertsey, the company has been making radios since its foundation in 1932 and claims to be the oldest active radio manufacturer in the UK. Roberts Radio have held a royal warrant since the 1950s.

== History ==
Roberts Radio was founded in 1932 by Harry Roberts (1910-1969) of Mile End and Leslie Bidmead of Kilburn. They financed the down payment on a small factory in London's Soho by selling Bidmead's motorbike. A few years later they moved across Oxford Street to no. 41 Rathbone Place. During the Blitz in the Second World War, they moved to East Molesey in Surrey. During this time the majority of production shifted from domestic radios to morse code tappers.

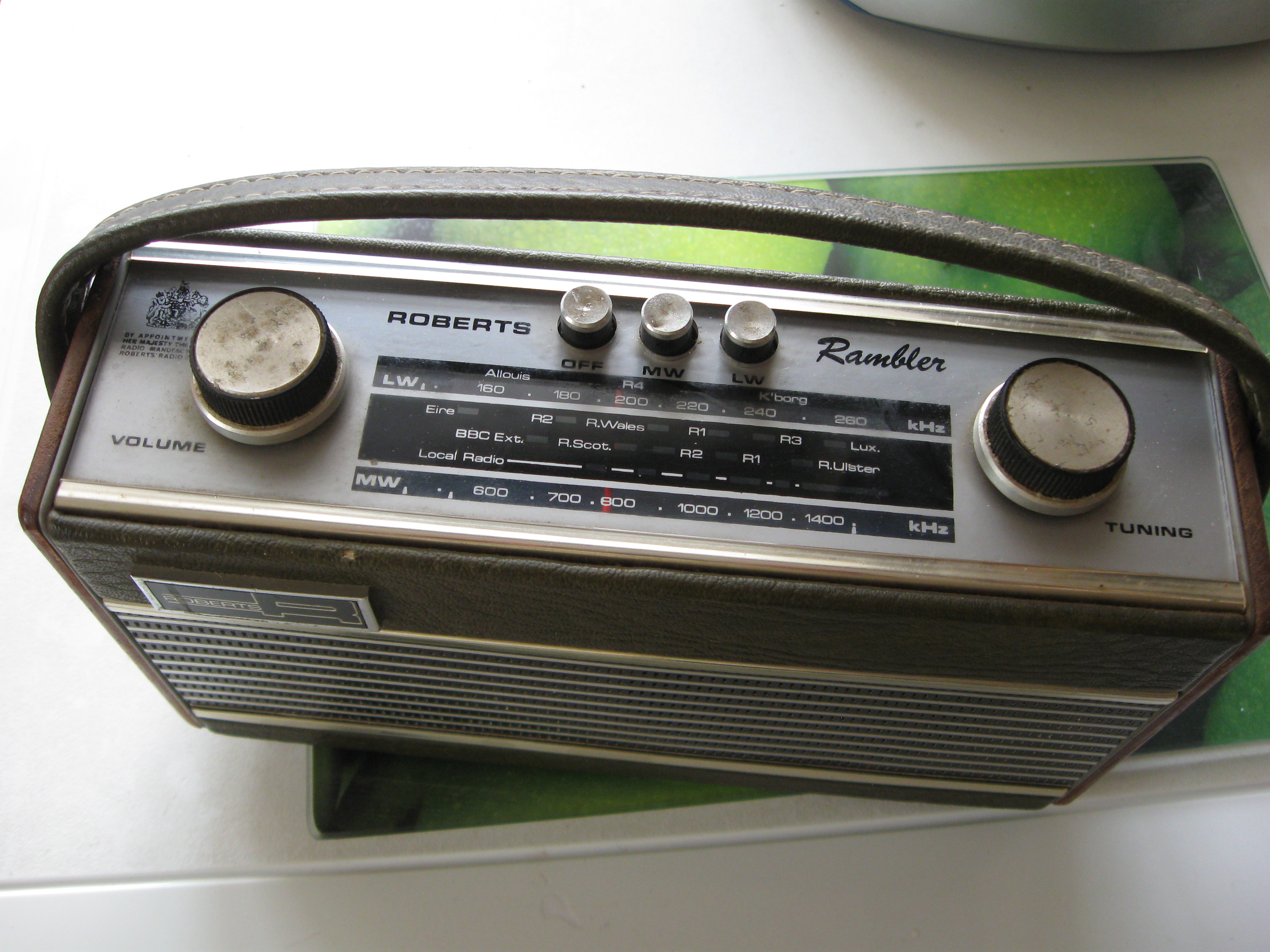
Roberts Rambler radio (1960s)

Roberts resumed producing domestic radios after the war and eventually gained a reputation for quality. They received a Royal Warrant to the Queen in 1955 and later another to the Queen Mother and the Prince of Wales in the 1980s. Another warrant was granted via the purchase of Dynatron Radio Ltd (Note: Bought from Philips, previously owned by Pye and EKCO) in 1981.

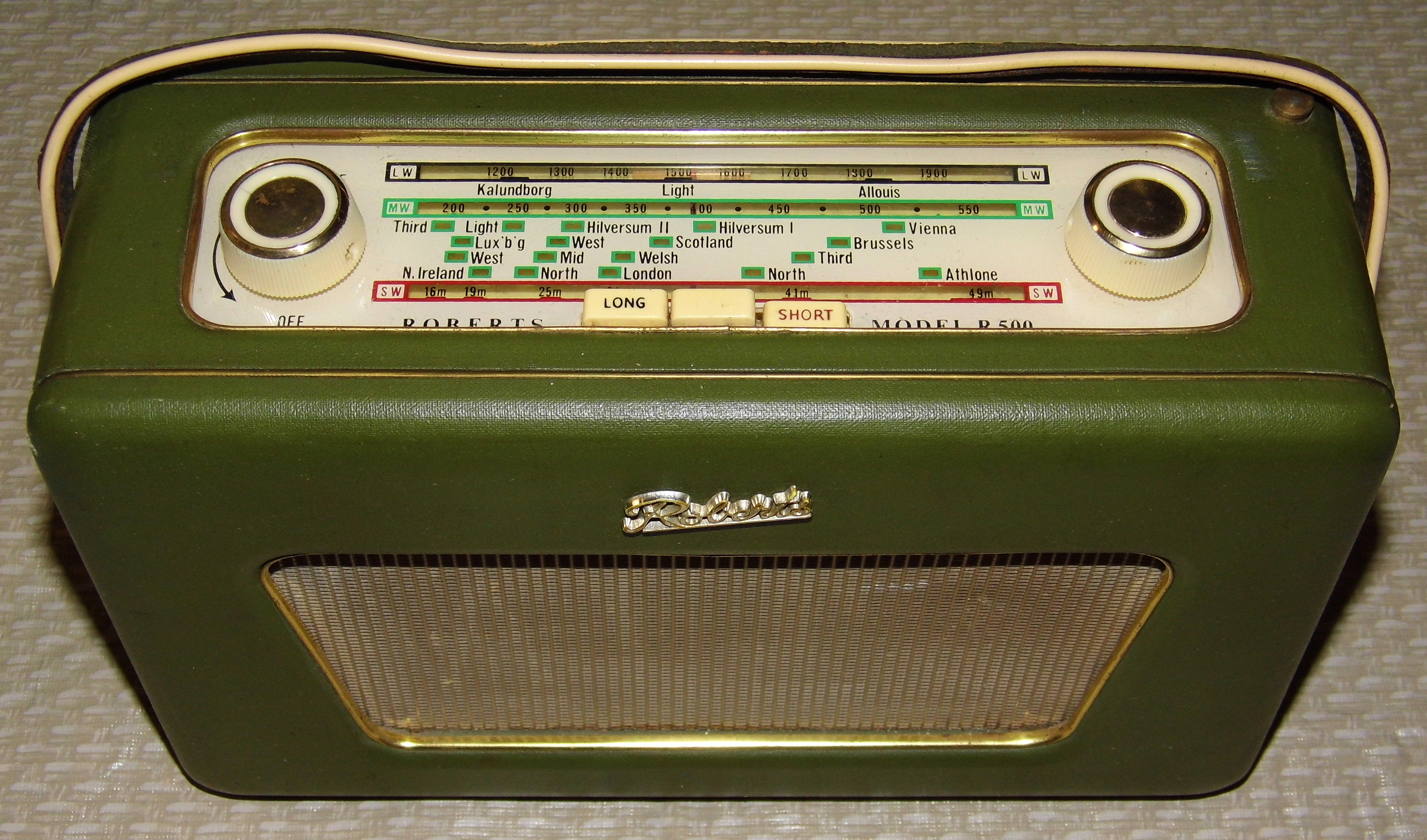
Roberts R500 radio LW/MW/SW (1960s)

The R66 portable valve radio was launched by Roberts in 1956, followed by their first portable transistor radio the RT1 in 1959. Its box-shaped design with a carry handle became popular among the public and celebrities in the 1960s, shaping the familiar Roberts design. It was designed by Bidmead, apparently inspired by a handbag belonging to his wife Elsie.

In 1962, the company had a purpose-built factory constructed in West Molesey. Co-founder Harry Roberts died in 1969, succeeded by son Richard who served until his own death in 1991.

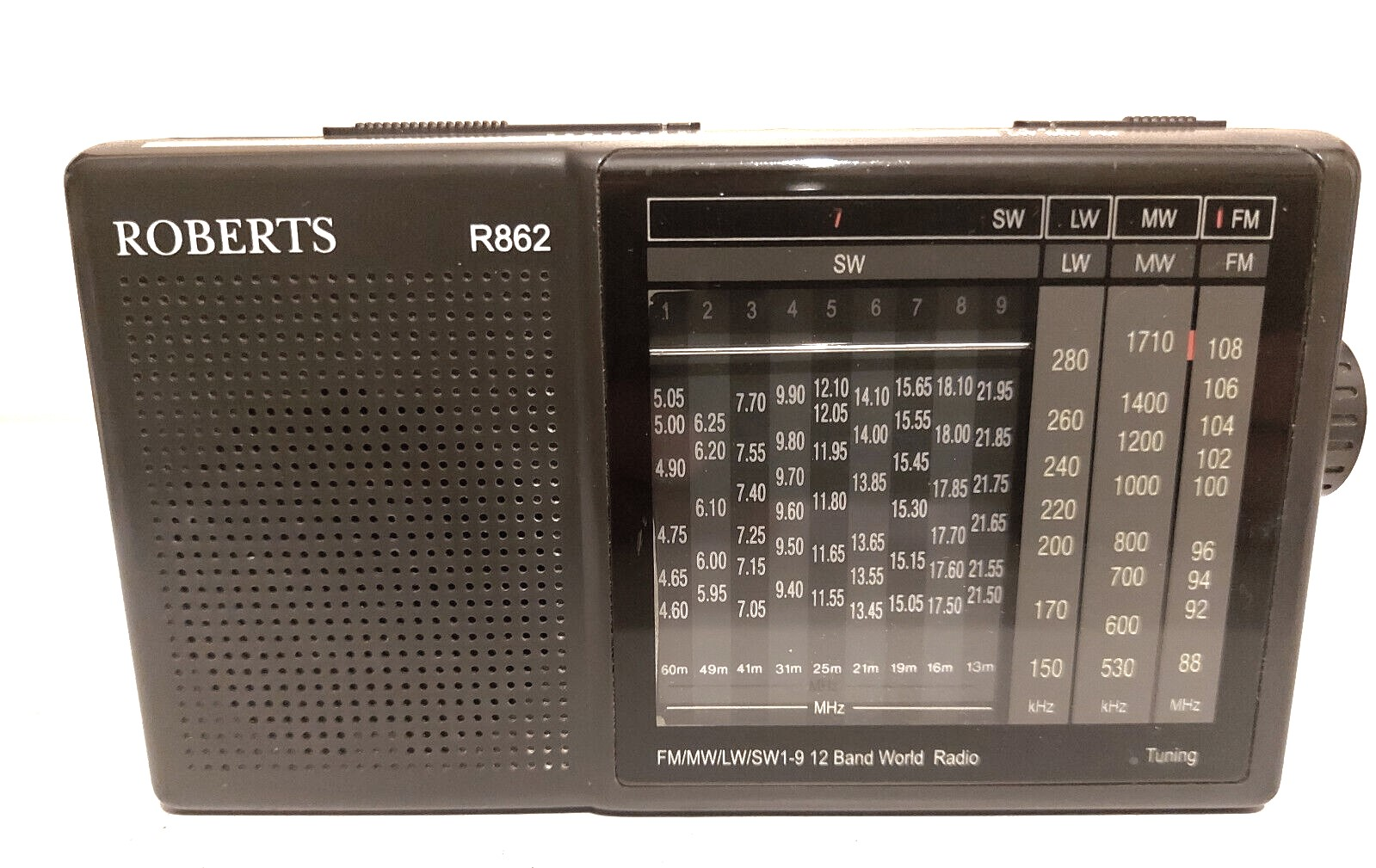
Roberts R862 portable radio

The company was struggling in the 1980s with the rise of television and imported Japanese electronics. In 1989, a classic red Roberts radio appeared in a Martini TV advert, which revived interest in the product. A replica of the 1950s radio was created and sold out in two limited runs. Public popularity led to the full reissue of the original design as the Roberts Revival (250 series) in 1993 in original red colour, with various new colours and designs numbering sixteen by the year 2000. The Revival has been Britain's best selling portable radio ever since.

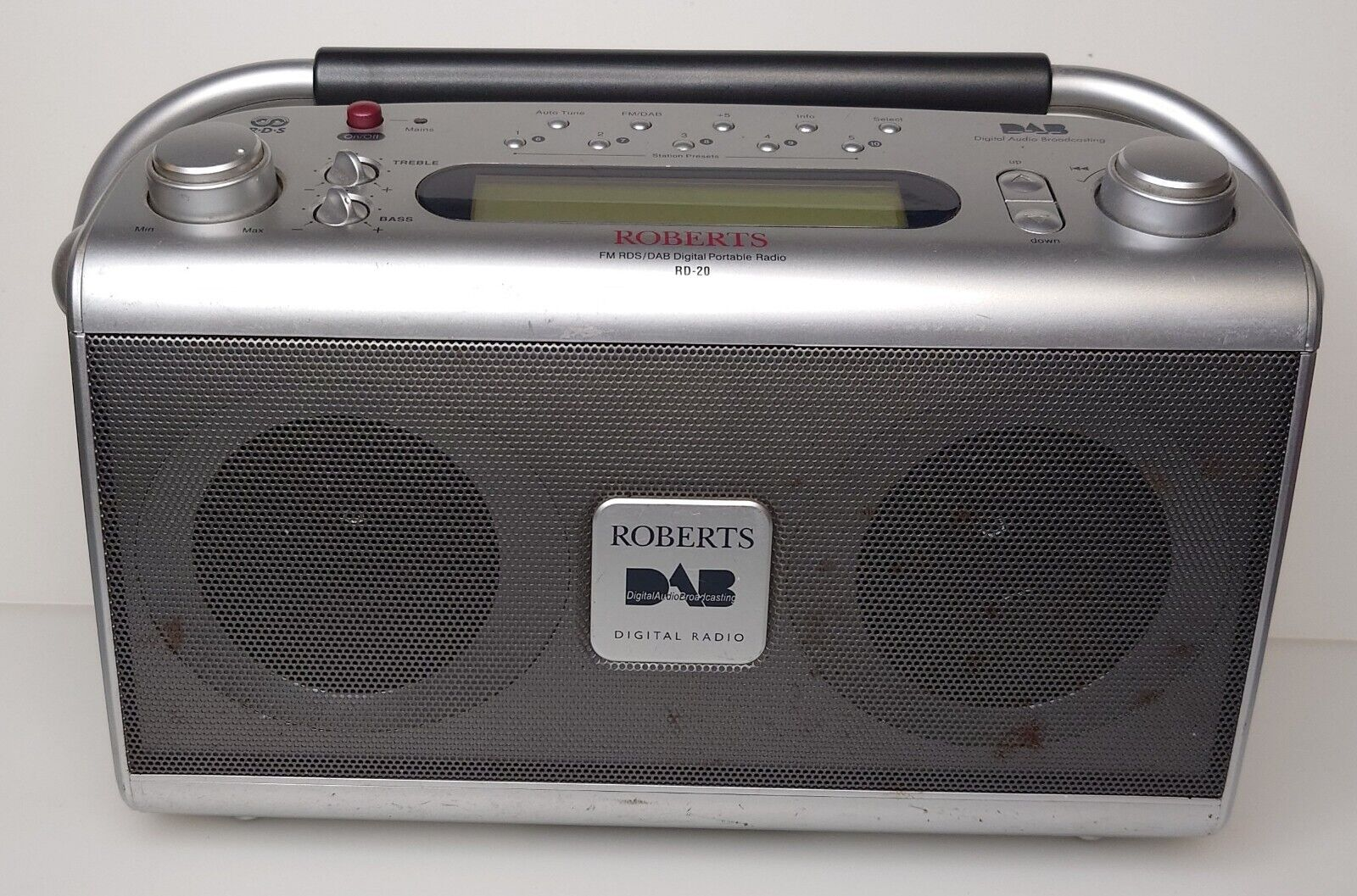
Roberts Gemini RD-20, one of the company's early DAB radios (2000s)

Roberts Radio was purchased by privately owned GlenDimplex Group in 1994. The company then moved headquarters and production north to Mexborough in South Yorkshire joining other GlenDimplex ventures. Roberts introduced their first DAB digital radio in 1999, the Classic 2000, which was released in May 2000. Roberts produced their first internet radio, the WM-201, in 2007. Its follow up was the Stream 202, which launched the Stream series of internet radio products from Roberts. The company launched the first solar-powered DAB radio in 2008.

The company moved to Chertsey in Surrey around 2020. Roberts later released the Revival Petite, which became the UK's best-selling radio receiver in 2022. This led to the release of a second generation Roberts Revival Petite 2 in 2024.

== Gallery ==
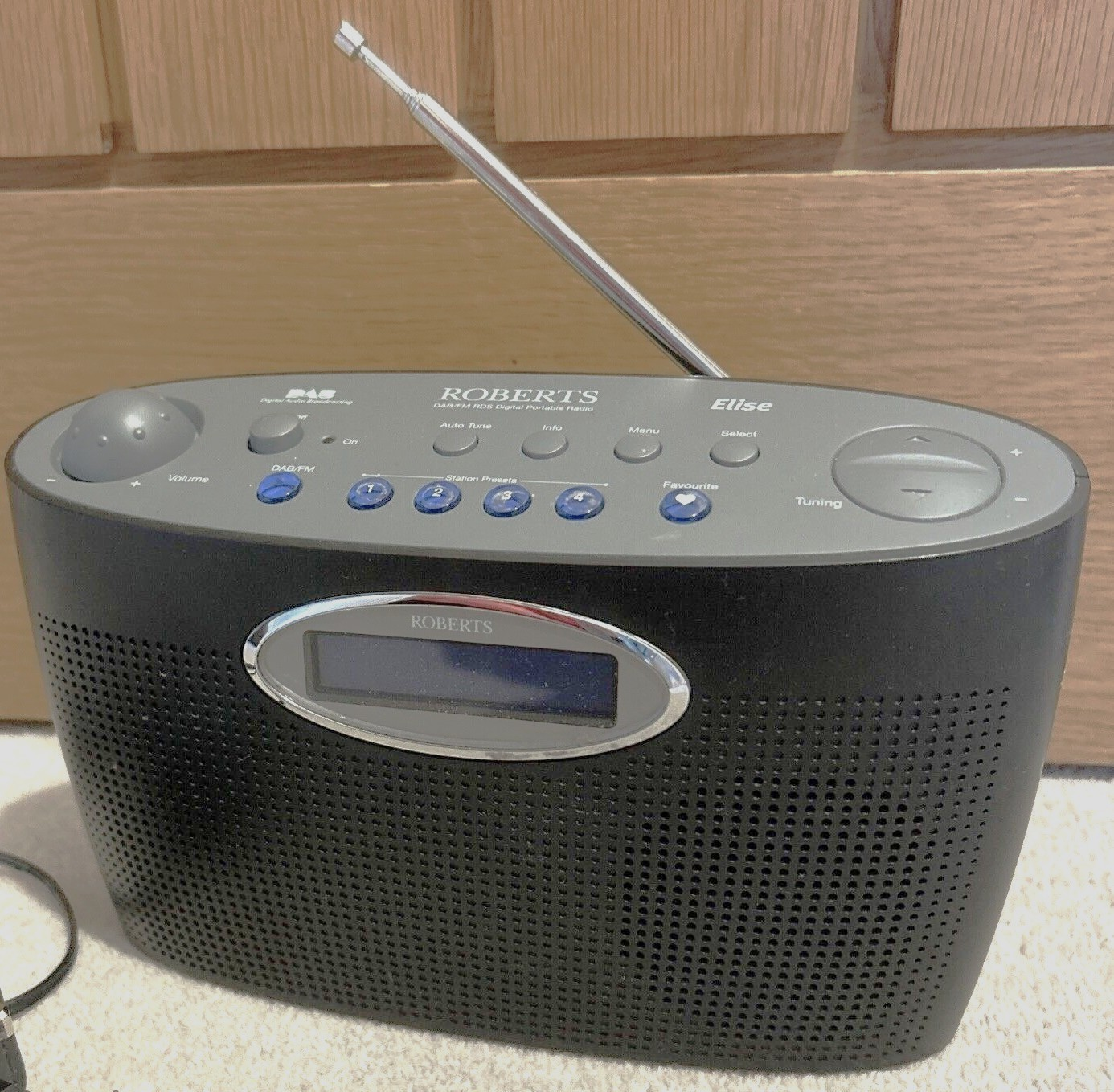
Roberts Elise DAB radio

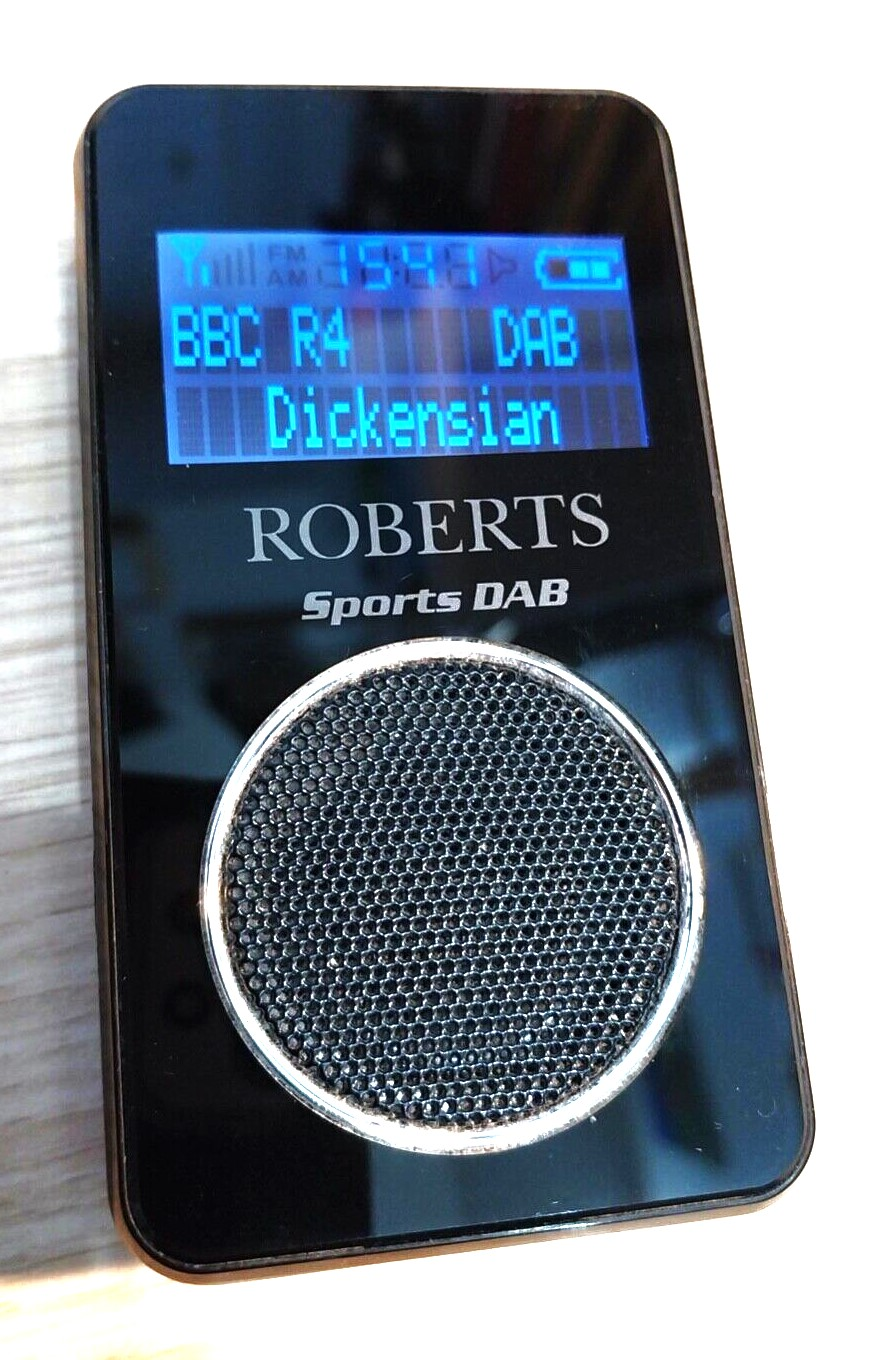
Roberts Sports DAB 2, portable DAB radio (2000s)

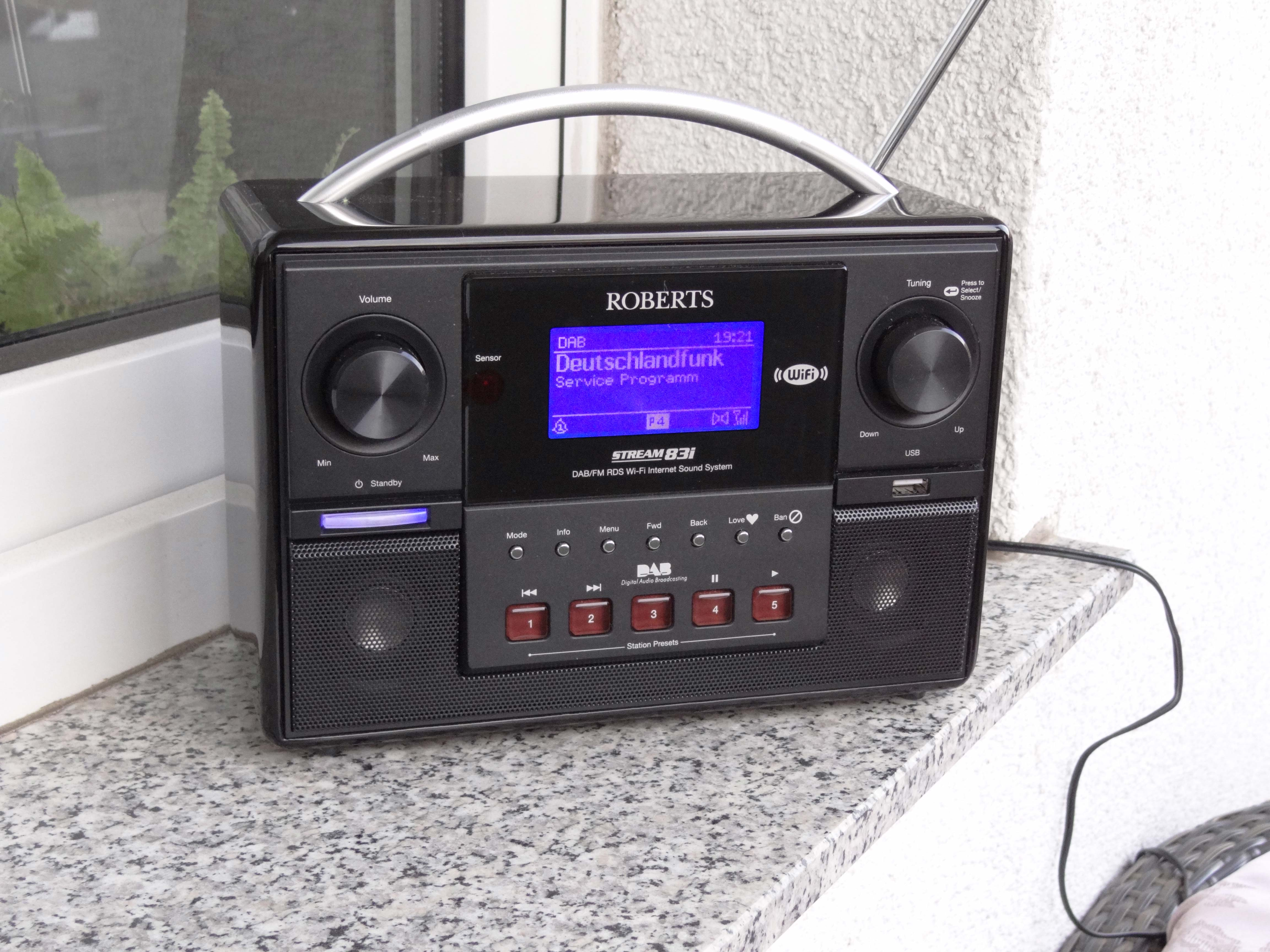
Roberts Stream 83i DAB/FM radio

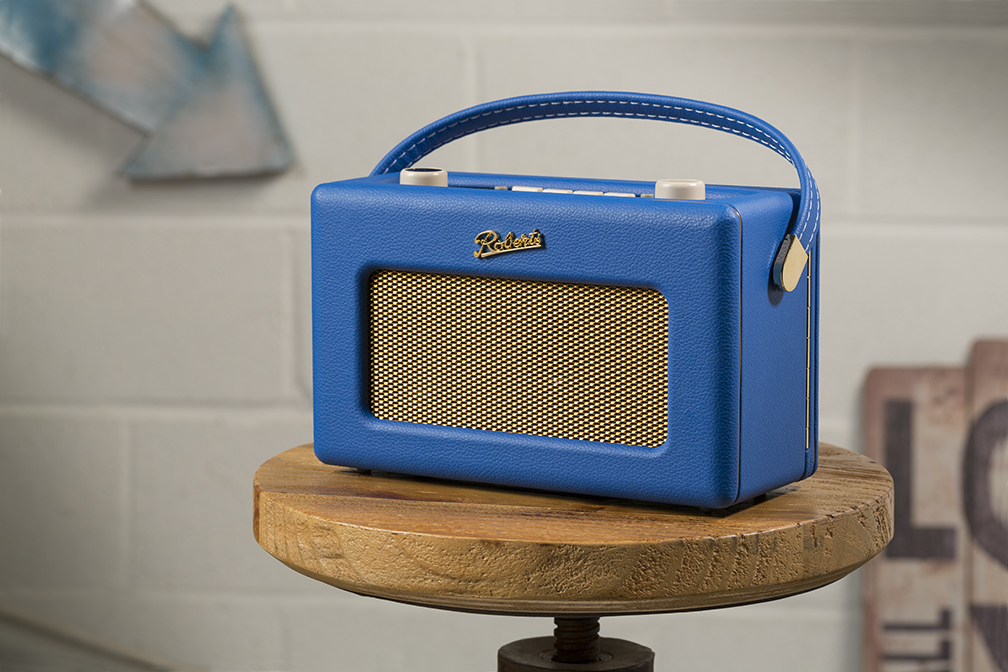
Roberts Revival RD60 DAB+/DAB/FM radio in Cobalt Blue colour

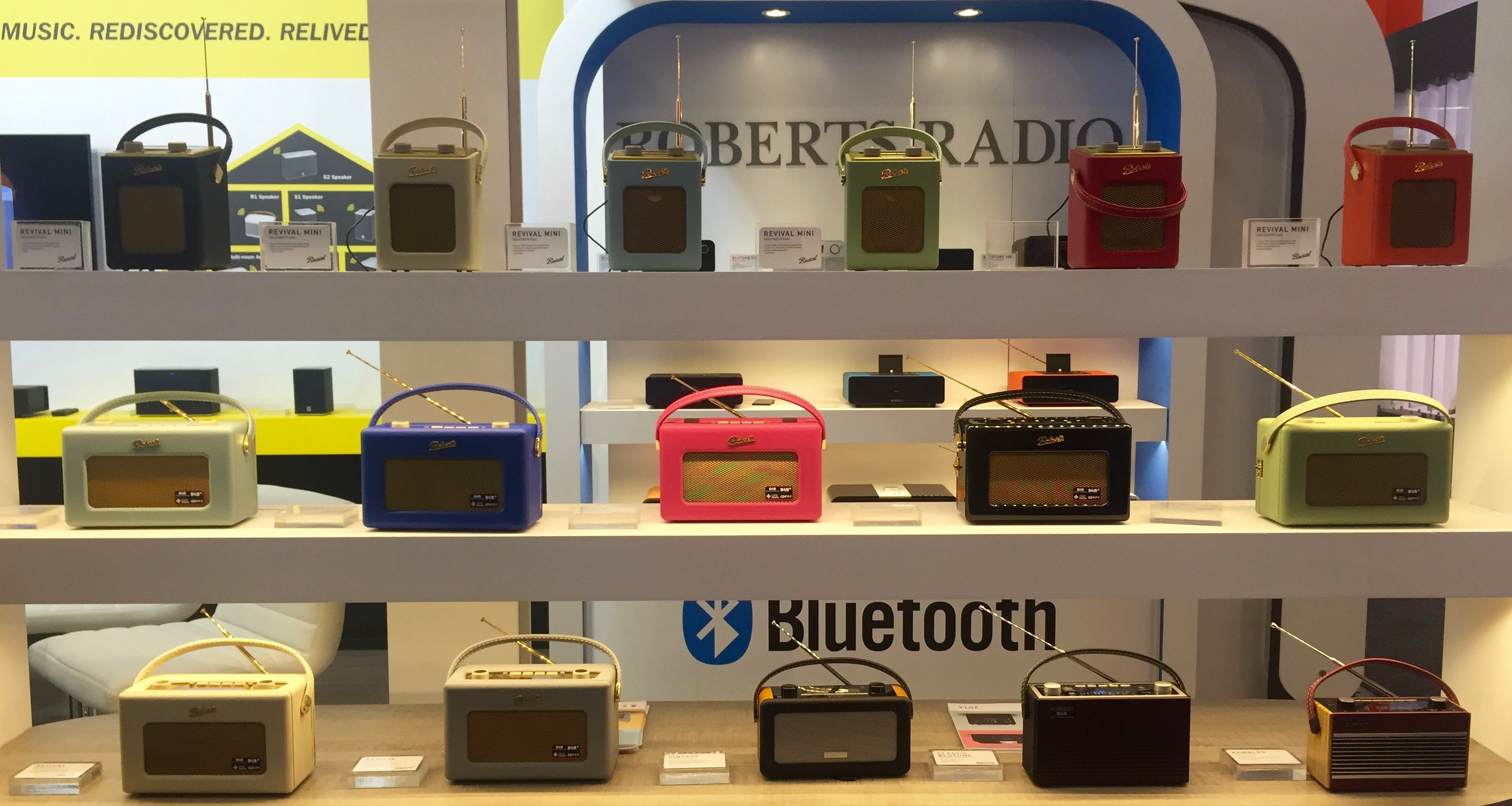
Digital radios from Roberts on display (2010s)

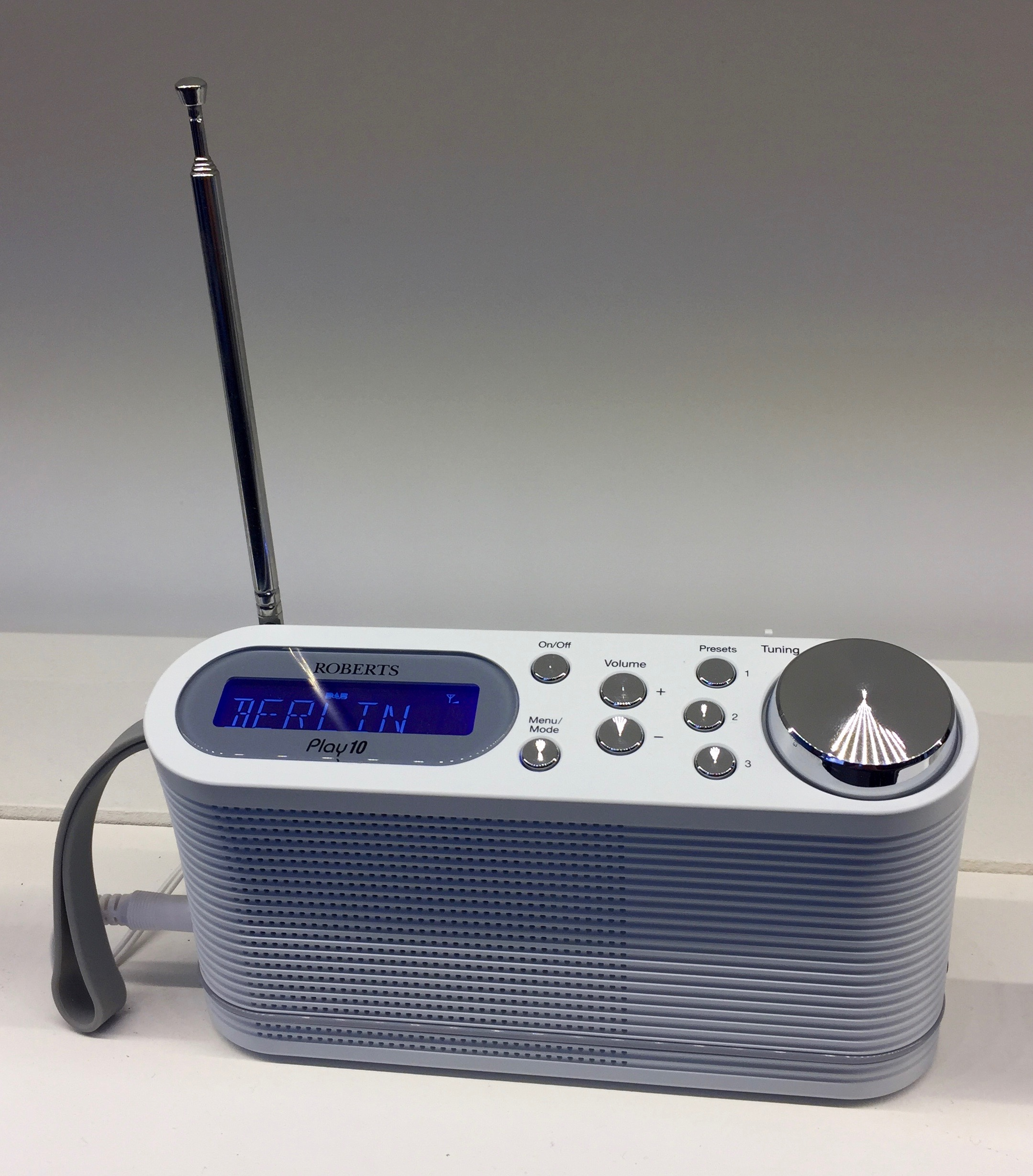
Roberts Play 10 portable DAB radio (2010s)

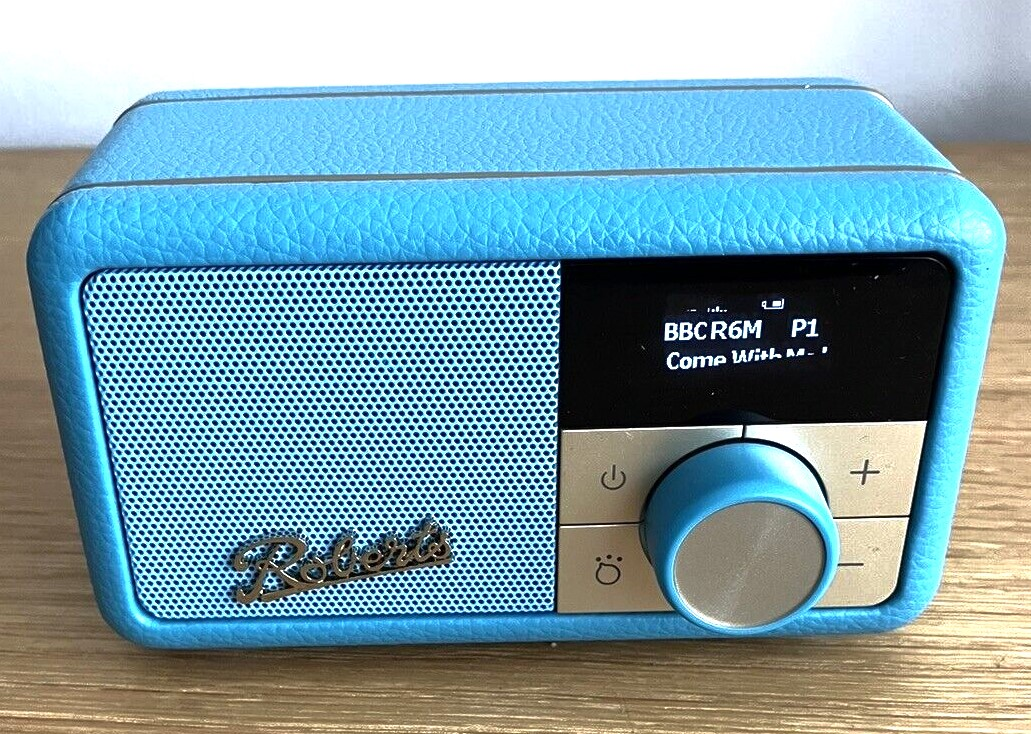
Roberts Revival Petite DAB radio (2020s)
