= Thumbplay =

Thumbplay is a U.S.-based subscription service that allows users to download music, video and games to their cell phones. Users can manage, store and share their mobile content online and on their wireless devices.

Headquartered in New York City, Thumbplay was founded in September 2004 by Are Traasdahl and Evan Schwartz. It is backed by Bain Capital Ventures, SoftBank Capital, i-Hatch Ventures, Redwood Partners, New Enterprise Associates, Meritech, Brookside Capital Partners and Cross Creek Capital.

It was acquired by Clear Channel Radio in March 2011.

== Services ==
Thumbplay's subscription service costs $9.99/month for access to 10 credits that can be redeemed for content in its online store. In addition, there is an advertising-supported community where consumers can upload mobile photos and videos and share these among other members. T-mobile users also filed complaints on third party billing scams. You can be charged for their service just by clicking an advertisement without even downloading their application on their phone.

Their download library contains audio, video and game downloads, including "premium content" licensed from most mainstream media and entertainment companies, as well as independent artists.

== Awards & Recognitions ==
In September 2010, Thumbplay is named Finalist in 2010 Music App Awards.

In June 2010, Thumbplay is named among MEFFY 2010 Finalists.

In 2009, Thumbplay receives New York Ten Award as the Best Emerging CEO 2009.

In 2009, Thumbplay is listed among Webby's “Official Honorees”.

In 2009, Thumbplay receives Stevie Award for "Customer Service Leader of the Year".

In 2008, Thumbplay is named Best of the Web 2008 Music by BusinessWeek.

In 2008, the company is named Deloitte's Rising Star 2008.

In 2008, Thumbplay is named to AlwaysOn Global 250 Top Private Companies 2008.

Thumbplay runs its customer care center out of Argentia, Newfoundland and Labrador, through a company called Tacamor Call Centers.

== Content & Distribution Partnerships ==
Thumbplay has signed licensing deals with some of the world’s largest media and entertainment companies during the last two years. This includes deals with all four major record labels: Universal Music Group, Sony BMG, Warner Music Group, and EMI, plus distributors l;ike Tunecore, as well as media and entertainment companies like Sony Pictures Home Entertainment, Disney Interactive Media Group, Glu Mobile, Hands-On Mobile, Konami Digital Entertainment, I-play, and Universal Pictures.

On the distribution side, Thumbplay has marketing partners both online and on the mobile web. These include the Web and mobile portals of AOL and MSN Mobile, Web sites for Entertainment Tonight, A&E Network, The History Channel and The Biography Channel, as well as social music discovery services iLike and Qloud. It is also partnered with Clear Channel Radio to operate mobile content stores across many of its stations’ websites throughout 2008.

Thumbplay is a member of the Mobile Marketing Association, and adheres to the MMA's Consumer Best Practices Guidelines.

== Acquisition by Clear Channel Radio ==
Thumbplay's partner Clear Channel Radio acquired it in March 2011.

== Consumer concerns ==
Thumbplay has been the target of numerous complaints that it does not immediately honour stop requests but instead continues to bill customers monthly fees after they request a cancellation, even if the customer does not continue to request any ringtones or wallpapers.
