= List of streaming media systems =

This is a list of streaming media systems. A more detailed comparison of streaming media systems is also available.

== Servers ==
- Ampache – GPL/LGPL Audio streaming
  - atmosph3re – responsive web-based streaming audio server for personal music collection
- Ant Media Server – Scalable, Ultra Low Latency & Adaptive WebRTC Streaming Server
- Darwin Streaming Server – Apple Public Source License
- dyne:bolic – Linux live CD ready for radio streaming
- emby – a media server/client that runs on Linux/Mac/Windows/freeBSD/docker & NAS devices with clients on Android TV/fireTV/Apple TV/Roku/Windows/PlayStation/Xbox/iOS & HTML5 Capable devices
- FFserver included in FFmpeg (discontinued)
- Firefly Media Server – GPL
- Flash Media Server
- FreeJ – video streamer for Icecast – GPL
- Helix Universal Server – delivers MPEG-DASH, RTSP, HTTP Live Streaming (HLS), RTMP; developed by RealNetworks, discontinued since October 2014
- HelixCommunity – RealNetworks Open Source development community
- Jellyfin – GPL-licensed fully open-source fork of Emby
- Icecast – GPL streaming media server
- IIS Media Services – Extensions for the Windows IIS web server that deliver intelligent progressive downloads, Smooth Streaming, and HTTP Live Streaming
- Kaltura – full-featured Affero GPL video platform running on your own servers or cloud
- LIVE555 – a set of open source (LGPL) C++ libraries for multimedia streaming; its RTSP/RTP/RTCP client implementation is used by VLC media player and MPlayer
- Lyrion Music Server – open source music streaming server, backboned by a music database (formerly SlimServer, SqueezeCenter, Squeezebox Server, and Logitech Media Server)
- Nimble Streamer – media server for live and VOD streaming with transcoding support
- nginx with Nginx-rtmp-module (BSD 2-clause)
- OpenBroadcaster – LPFM IPTV broadcast automation tools with AGPL Linux Python play out based on Gstreamer
- Open Broadcaster Software – open source streaming and recording program for Windows, Linux and OS X, maintained by the OBS Project
- PlayOn – a media server that runs on a PC and supports Netflix streaming
- Plex – a media server/client that runs on Linux/Mac/Windows with clients on iOS/Android/Windows/Mac/Linux
- PS3 Media Server – GPLv2e media server for streaming to a PlayStation 3
- Red5 – Apache licensed media server for RTMP and HLS
- QuickTime Broadcaster – Free on OS X
- Sirannon – a GPL, C++ media server and client
- SHOUTcast – audio streaming (HTTP and/or multicast)
- SoundBridge
- Starlight Networks – StarWorks and StarLive, early commercial Streaming products
- TVersity Media Server – partially open source, web-based media server
- VideoLAN – GPL
- Vidiator – Xenon Streaming Server
- VMix – a software switcher, recorder and live streaming program for Windows, developed by Studio Coast PTY LTD
- Windows Media Encoder
- Windows Media Services
- Wowza Streaming Engine – a media server for Flash, Silverlight, Apple iOS (iPhone/iPad), QuickTime, 3GPP mobile, IPTV and game console video/audio streaming

== P2P ==
Peer-to-peer video streaming solutions:

- WebRTC

== Services ==
- 3ABN+
- JustWatch
- 8tracks
- AbemaTV
- AccuRadio
- Amazon Music
- Amazon Prime Video
- Anghami
- Apple Music
- Apple TV
- Apple TV+
- Aupeo
- Azteca Now
- Beats Music
- BET+
- Blim TV – (defunct)
- Bollywood hungama
- BroadwayHD
- CBC Gem
- Crackle
- Crunchyroll
- Curiosity Stream
- CW Seed
- DAZN
- DC Universe (Formerly streamed shows; now only offers unlimited comic subscription service as DC Universe Infinite)
- Deezer
- Discovery+
- Disney+
- eMusic
- Eros Now
- ESPN+
- Facebook Watch
- 5
- FilmStruck – (defunct November 29, 2018)
- Funimation Channel
- Gaana
- Globoplay
- gogoyoko
- Google Play Music – (discontinued December 3, 2020)
- Google TV
- Groove Music – (discontinued December 31, 2017)
- Grooveshark – (defunct April 30, 2015)
- Guvera – (defunct)
- Hayu
- HBO Go – (defunct in U.S. July 31, 2020; still available in other countries)
- HBO Max
- HBO Now – (partially defunct)
- Hidive
- Hotstar
- Hulu
- iHeartRadio
- iLike – (defunct)
- Jango
- JioSaavn
- Justin.tv – Allows users to produce and watch live streaming video. (defunct August 5, 2014 as it became Twitch)
- Kocowa
- Last.fm – Internet radio and music community website
- Line Music
- Live365 – Streaming media library (Defunct January 31, 2016, relaunched under new ownership with reduced availability 2017)
- MediaCore – Video learning platform
- Medici.tv – Classical music video streaming
- MeeMix
- MetaCDN – Live video streaming platform
- mog
- Mofibo – Audio & Ebook streaming
- Movies Anywhere
- Murfie – Storage and streaming of CDs, vinyl, and cassettes
- Musicovery
- MX Player
- MySpace
- NBC Sports Gold
- Netflix
- Noggin
- Pandora Radio
- Paramount+
- Peacock
- Play.it
- Playlist.com
- Pluto TV
- Qik
- Quibi – (defunct December 1, 2020)
- Radiolicious – Internet radio
- Radionomy
- Raditaz
- Radio.com
- Rdio – (defunct December 22, 2015)
- Rooster Teeth First – (defunct May 15, 2024)
- Seeso (defunct November 8, 2017)
- ShemarooMe
- Side+
- SiriusXM – Internet Radio, MySXM
- Sling TV
- Songza
- SonyLIV
- SoundCloud
- Spotify – Free and paid streaming music service (browser, client and mobile applications)
- Star+
- Stitcher Radio
- Sun NXT
- TIDAL
- TVING - a South Korean internet streaming service
- Triton Digital
- Tubi
- TuneIn
- Ustream.tv
- Viaplay
- Vidio
- Vimeo
- Voot
- VRV
- Vudu
- VyRT
- Wakanim
- we7
- Wuala – Free online storage with streaming capability
- Wynk
- Xumo
- YouTube/YouTube Premium
- YouTube Music
- YuppTV
- ZEE5

== Clients ==
- Amarok
- Bitmovin's bitdash player
- Clementine (forked from Amarok 1.4)
- Kodi (formerly XBMC), a free and open source media center software and framework platform
- MediaMonkey
- MPlayer
- Rhythmbox
- Roku
- Streamripper
- Total Recorder
- Totem
- VLC media player
- Winamp a freeware media player for Microsoft Windows.
- XMMS

== See also ==
- Comparison of music streaming services
- Comparison of video hosting services
- List of Internet radio stations
- List of online music databases
- List of online video platforms
