= Raditaz =

Internet radio-streaming music service

- Website type: Free Internet Radio
- Available in: English
- Headquarters: Glastonbury, Connecticut, U.S.
- Website: www.raditaz.net
- Launched: November 18, 2011
- Current status: Offline

Raditaz was an internet radio streaming music service for the web, iOS, and Android. Raditaz was a free product, and users could create stations, listen to over 200 customised stations, and utilize a tagging system to personalize their own stations. Users could find stations not just based on artists, songs, and genres, but also based on metadata tags, such as @work, @gym, #happy, or @driving. Raditaz had a location layer that enabled users to listen to and share stations that trending throughout the US. The "explore" feature let a user discover the latest music trends by location. Users could also share songs or stations by email, Facebook, Twitter or Pinterest. Raditaz had more than 23 million songs and used The Echo Nest music intelligence platform for creating stations. When a user input the name of a specific band, artist or song, Raditaz could create a station based on that musician along with similar artists. Users also had the option to add an additional nine artists to customize a station further. Listeners could adjust the popularity level of the artists and songs found within the station. The site went offline in 2012 to undergo a complete makeover, with new features expected. The Raditaz revenue model is location-based advertising, but no target date for ads has been set.

== Licensing ==
Raditaz formerly streamed music under the statutory license for Non-Interactive Internet Streaming defined by United States Code Title 17, Section 114, enacted through the Digital Millennium Copyright Act (DMCA). Raditaz paid sound recording copyright holders for each performance (each track played) through SoundExchange. Raditaz also paid the performance rights holders through American Society of Composers, Authors and Publishers (ASCAP), Broadcast Music, Inc. (BMI) and Society of European Stage Authors & Composers (SESAC).

1. Raditaz benefited from the lower statutory rates that resolved the U.S. royalty controversy in 2007.
2. The statutory license limits where Raditaz can stream music geographically and how Raditaz users can interact with the system.

=== Geographic limitation: U.S. only ===
Since the statute only applies to the United States, Raditaz is not licensed to stream music outside the United States. The Raditaz web site was only available to users who, based on their IP address, are located in the United States or one of its unincorporated organized Territories. The iOS and Android apps are only available in the U.S. sections of the App Store and Google Play.

=== Similar services ===
- AUPEO!
- Earbits
- Grooveshark
- Guvera
- iHeartRadio
- Last.fm
- MOG (online music)
- Pandora
- play.it (radio.com)
- Rdio
- Rhapsody (online music service)
- Slacker (music service)
- Songza
- Spotify
- Soundtracker (music streaming)

== See also ==
- Internet radio
- List of streaming media systems
