= WiMP =

Former music-streaming service

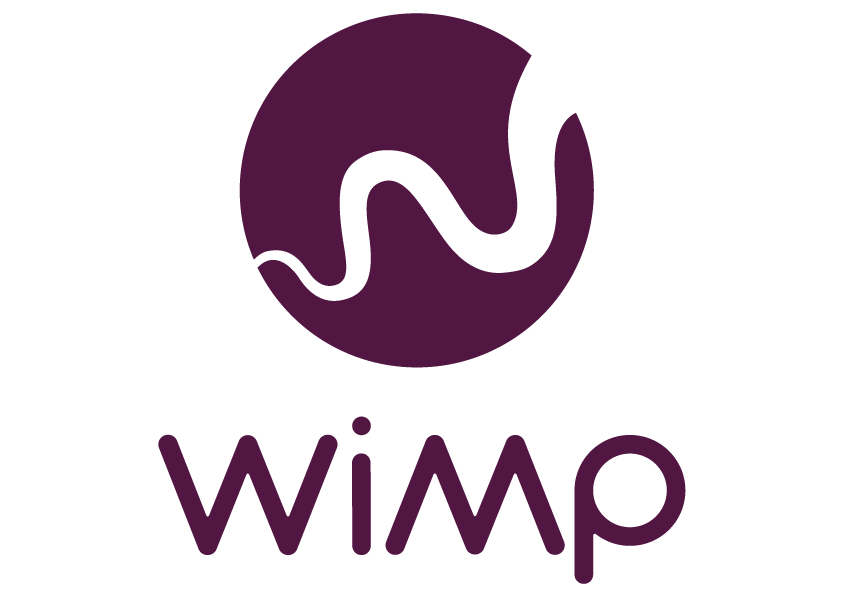
- Original author: WiMP Music
- Developer: Aspiro
- Release: February 19, 2010; 16 years ago
- Stable release: 2.4.1
- Operating system: Microsoft Windows, Apple Mac OS X, Android, iOS, Windows Phone, MeeGo
- Platform: Adobe Air, cross-platform
- Available in: Norwegian, Swedish, Danish, German, Polish
- Type: Music
- License: Proprietary
- Website: www.wimpmusic.com (Dead link) Deprecated link archived 8 February 2014 at archive.today

WiMP (Wireless Music Player) was a music streaming service available on mobile devices, tablets, network players and computers. WiMP offered music and podcasts. It was initially created as a streaming service aimed at audiophiles.

== History ==
WiMP was developed by Aspiro AB and the Norwegian music store chain Platekompaniet AS. It first launched in Norway in February 2010. In 2013, it introduced a HiFi tier with lossless audio playback using FLAC and ALAC formats.

On January 30, 2015, it was announced that Aspiro AB had been acquired by Project Panther Bidco Ltd., which is indirectly owned by S. Carter Enterprises, LLC. The company was controlled by Shawn Corey Carter, better known by his stage name, Jay-Z. Aspiro AB was sold for 464 million SEK, which is about €50 million or US $56 million. However, WiMP would later merge with Tidal.

== Cost and availability ==
WiMP was based on a subscription model. In 2012, it was available in Norway, Denmark, Sweden, Germany and Poland.

=== Tidal ===
After WiMP merged with Tidal, it became available in the United States, Canada, the UK, Ireland, Finland, the Netherlands, Belgium, Luxembourg, France, Switzerland, Austria, Hungary, Romania and Turkey. Tidal claimed to have 80 million tracks.

=== Last.fm integration ===
The application was integrated with Last.fm, allowing a track to be "scrobbled".

=== Music catalog ===
WiMP had a music library with around 25 million tracks. WiMP had local editors in each country it operated in and had in-app magazines. WiMP also offered music videos for Android users.

=== Mobile devices ===
WiMP was compatible with Android, iOS, Symbian, MeeGo, Windows Phone 7 and Windows Phone 8, as well as Squeezebox, Sonos, Simple Audio, Auralic, Teufel Audio and Bluesound.

== See also ==
- Last.fm
- rara.com
- Spotify
- Grooveshark
- Guvera
- Soundtracker (music streaming)
- List of online music databases
- Comparison of online music stores
