= Just Hear It =

Online music search engine

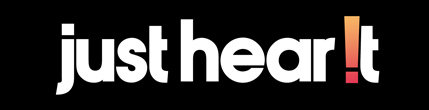
- Website type: Music, Search
- Available in: English
- Owner: HearIt Inc.
- Creators: Cosmin Panait; Nicolae Ivanescu
- Website: www.justhearit.com
- Registration: Optional
- Launched: 2008
- Current status: Closed

Just Hear It, stylized just hear !t, is an online music search engine, music discovery, and music streaming service. It allows users to search for and instantly listen to any song from its collection of over 16 Million tracks. As of January 2010, Just Hear It has displayed only an interactive image of its logo on the website.

== Features ==
Just Hear It allows users to search, play songs and create playlists. Other features such as creating a Media Library, saving playlists and bookmarking songs were available only to members of its Private Beta program. Just Hear It does now allow users to download songs.

Just Hear It's homepage design is very minimalistic and similar to that of Google Search. It features nothing more than a search bar, a few links and a sentence that prompted users to "search the web for any song in the world". Recently, the sentence had been replaced with the company's slogan "Any song. Legal. Free."

The interface runs in Adobe Flash, features a glossy black background and is organized in three distinct areas. The left area is occupied by a search bar, the center by a song list, similar to that of iTunes, and the right area by a player and playlist manager. Its player is one of the few on the internet that includes the full functionality of standard music services, including shuffle and repeat buttons.

Almost all interactions with the website, including adding songs to playlists and reordering songs work through drag-and-drop actions. The interface features a subtle color changing ribbon-like wave in the background that added to the visual experience.

== History ==
Just Hear It was founded in 2008 in Los Angeles, California by USC student Nicolae Ivanescu and Emory University student Cosmin Panait. Their goal was to "change the stereotype that free music is illegal while immersing the user in a unique visual experience" and "become the place for music".

Just Hear It launched in Private Beta in late 2008 at USC and Emory University as a free service with no advertisements. During the first months of its private beta stage, the website was visited by well over 1 million people.

== Legality ==
Just Hear It functions as a music search engine and follows DMCA guidelines, paying royalties to all of the major performing-rights organizations. The founders are aiming to negotiate direct deals with record labels.

== See also ==
- List of online music databases
- imeem
- Spotify
- Last.fm
- Grooveshark
- Guvera
- Seeqpod
- Deezer
- Songza
- Streaming media
- Soundtracker (music streaming)
