= Soundtracker (music streaming) =

- Company type: Privately held company
- Available in: 10+ languages
- Founded: 2008
- Headquarters: Washington DC, United States
- Country of origin: United States
- Founder: Daniele Calabrese
- CEO: Daniele Calabrese
- Industry: Music
- Employees: 20
- Website: soundtracker.fm
- Registration: Required
- Users: 1.2 million
- Launched: December 19, 2009
- Current status: Active
- Native clients on: Windows, Windows Phone, Linux, BlackBerry OS, Android, iOS, ChromeOS, and macOS

SoundayMusic (formerly known as Soundtracker) is a geosocial networking mobile music streaming app that enables users to listen to and track the music their friends and neighbors are playing in real time. The service provides over 32 million tracks and allows users to create "music stations" choosing between a mix of up to three artists, or choosing a music genre. In the free version users can create up to 10 personalized stations, look at the stations that are being played nearby in real time, and interact with other users through instant chat. The paid, premium subscription removes advertisements and allows users to create an unlimited number of stations. It was launched in 2009> by Soundtracker, and as of December 2014 the service had 1.3 million registered users. Soundtracker is available for iOS App Store, Android Google Play, Windows Phone Store, Windows Store, Google Glass, BlackBerry World, Samsung Apps, Amazon Appstore, Nook, and Samsung Smart TV, in 10 languages: English, Spanish, French, German, Portuguese, Italian, Chinese Simplified, Japanese, Korean and Russian. Soundtracker is a registered trademark.

== Beginnings ==
The company was formed in late 2008 by a team composed of Daniele Calabrese and 25 software developers and designers. Soundtracker was first marketed in 2010 in San Francisco, and today has offices in Washington DC and Cagliari, Italy.

== Evolution ==
The first mobile platform, iOS, was developed by Daniele Calabrese and his team in Silicon Valley in 2009. The iOS app at its inception featured 13 million tracks and allowed geo-tagging.

In 2010 the team moved to Boston where it developed the stations, push notifications, interaction with nearby listeners, and the app for Windows Phone 7. Also in 2010, a website was introduced to provide access to non-mobile users, and the app was made available on Android, Java, Windows 7 and BlackBerry platforms.

== See also ==
- 8tracks
- Beats Music
- Musixmatch
- Bloom.fm
- Boiler Room (music project)
- Deezer
- FIT Radio
- fizy
- Google Play Music All Access
- Grooveshark
- Guvera
- iHeartRadio
- iTunes Store
- Just Hear It
- Last.fm
- Live365
- List of online music databases
- MOG
- Pandora
- Raditaz
- rara.com
- Rdio
- Record Union
- Rhapsody
- Slacker
- Songza
- Sony Music Unlimited
- SoundCloud
- Streaming media
- TuneIn
- WiMP
