= 7digital =

British media company

7digital Group Plc
- Industry: B2B Music Technology Services
- Founded: January 2004
- Headquarters: 69 Wilson Street, London EC2A 2BB, London, United Kingdom
- Number of locations: 5
- Area served: 20 countries (August 2023)
- Key people: Paul Langworthy (CEO); Michael Juskiewicz (CFO); Samantha Sawyer (CCO); Jon Hilbrants (CCO)
- Services: White-label music solutions, API, music download stores, production, streaming music services, radio services, voucher promotions, loyalty schemes
- Revenue: EUR 6.69 million (2021)
- Owner: Songtradr
- Number of employees: 70
- Subsidiaries: Entertainment News, Unique The Production Company, Smooth Operations, Unique Interactive, Above The Title
- Website: www.7digital.com

7digital Group PLC is a British company that offers access to music, tracking and reporting for clients. London-based, 7digital provides end-to-end music services for the fitness, social media, DSPs, and gaming industries with brands such as Barry's and Triller. Advertising Age described 7digital (Zdigital in Australia) in 2008 as a British download store, while the New York Times referred to them as a digital music company. 7digital's Smooth Operations, Unique Production and Above the Title companies are now branded 7digital Creative, and produce content for BBC Radio 1, Radio 1Xtra, BBC Radio 2 and BBC Radio 3. In 2009 HMV bought 50% of 7digital. In 2019, the company replaced their second CEO, Simon Cole, who had replaced founder/CEO Ben Drury. In February 2023, it was announced 7digital had been acquired by the Santa Monica-headquartered B2B music licensing company, Songtradr.

== Overview ==
Initially their API was used by Guvera, Onkyo, Samsung, BlackBerry, HMV, musical.ly (now TikTok) and Technics. They subsequently partnered with Triller, FORME Life, Soundtrack Your Brand, Global Eagle, Grandpad, Apex Rides, and Fender.

== History ==
=== 2004–2009 ===
7digital was founded in 2004 by Ben Drury and James Kane as a B2B digital music services company, building music download stores for record labels, brands and other retailers. 7digital Direct to Consumer (D2C) service was launched in 2005.

7digital is backed by technology venture capital firm Balderton Capital (formerly Benchmark Capital Europe). On 28 January 2008, 7digital raised £4.25m in its series B investor round, securing investment from various groups including Sutton Place Managers. The investment was to be used to launch 7digital.com in more European countries and the United States, along with expanding the sites offerings to include downloadable video and computer games.

In September 2008, 7digital.com was the first company in Europe to launch DRM-free MP3 downloads with all four major record labels.

As of October 2008, 7digital employed 45 people in London and had over 1.3 million registered customers.

On 3 August 2009, HMV bought a 50% holding in 7digital from its venture capital owners.

=== 2010-2019 ===
In 2011, 7digital expanded with an office in Luxembourg and in early 2012, they expanded to the US with an office in San Francisco, CA.

In October 2012, 7digital secured $10 million in funding from two new investors, Dolby and Imagination Technologies. HMV's stake was previously reduced to less than 20%, and following HMV entering into administration, retail restructuring specialists Hilco, are now the holders of these shares.

On 25 November 2013, UBC Media announced merger plans with 7digital by way of a reverse takeover. The merger was completed in May 2014, forming 7digital Group Plc.

The company entered a business relationship with MediaMarktSaturn in 2017, which it ended in 2019, in exchange for a cash payment of €4 million. The end of the partnership led to a need for 7digital to raise capital by the third quarter of 2019 to remain operational. The share price fell in response to these developments, with a loss of 63% on 9 April and further losses on 10 April 2019.

== Clients ==
7digital's agnostic platform is used for building products on any type of connected device.

- Barry's
- Kuaishou: Kuaishou has multiple short video platforms and live broadcasts apps around the world including Kuaishou, Kuaishou Lite, Kwai, Zynn, and Snack Video
- Apex Rides: London-based Apex Rides, a smart bike and in-home fitness platform
- Triller: US-based short-form video sharing app (and TikTok rival)
- Musical.ly: (May 2016)
- eMusic: (Jan 2016)
- Guvera: (July 2014) On 10 November 2014, Guvera announced that it had launched its streaming service in India. They shut down in May 2017.
- Onkyo: (June 2014) The Onkyo Music service ceased operation on 6 October 2019.
- Spanish Broadcasting System: (September 2014)
- Panasonic: (November 2014) They shut down the Service in 2019.
- Samsung: for Music Hub version 1.0. Replaced nu by 2.0 and 3.0 dependent on the territory that the handset was designated for. In 2012 with the launch of Samsung Galaxy S3 devices in Europe and North America the Music Hub has begun to include subscription streaming alongside their music downloads. 7digital pre-install is also available on Samsung Galaxy S4.
- BlackBerry: (initially 2010, then for their OS 7 devices)
  - subsequently for Blackberry 10 users.
  - 2012: service to run on their new OS (QNX)

=== HMV ===
7digital is independent of their business since significant investment they received in 2012. Re-launched in October 2013, HMVdigital.com is a download store.

=== Ubuntu One Music Store/Canonical ===
7digital collaborated with Canonical Ltd. to provide the Ubuntu One Music Store in the Ubuntu Operating System starting from Ubuntu 10.04.

On 2 April 2014 Canonical announced the closure of all of the Ubuntu One file services.

=== Spotify ===
Spotify users from the UK, France, Norway, Finland, Spain, The Netherlands and Sweden were able to purchase tracks to download (if available) from 7digital in 2009. This was done by right-clicking and selecting the 'Buy From' link. However, Spotify launched their own purchase service during 2011 which replaced 7digital.

=== Other ===
In October 2014, it was announced that 7digital would work with will.i.am for his new wearable smart device.

In November 2014, 7digital partners Technics launched 'Technics Tracks', a new premium Hi-Resolution audio service.

== 7digital.com ==
Alongside its B2B digital music services business, 7digital offers music tracks direct to consumers in MQA, MP3 320, 256, M4A, 16-bit and 24-bit FLAC audio.

The 7digital mobile app has been pre-installed on devices through partnerships with Acer, HTC, Samsung, BlackBerry, Pioneer, HP, Dell, and Sonos.

7digital's Indiestore launched in early 2006 and allowed unsigned artists and independent labels create their own digital music download store for free. The Indiestore was discontinued in 2010. 7digital directs independent artists to work with independent aggregators, where they will be able to service their music to a variety of music retailers.

In December 2014, 7digital became the first music platform to adopt Meridian Audio's high-quality MQA format for streaming/downloads.

=== Geographical availability ===
As of July 2015, 7digital operated in 82 countries. On May 19, 2017, 7digital announced the sudden closure of its EU store, though it continued to have stores for some individual European nations. As of 2023, the service is still available in 20 countries.

== See also ==
- HD Audio
