= Sirannon =

Sirannon may refer to:

- Sirannon, a fictional river in Moria, Middle-earth
- Sirannon (streaming), an open source media server
