= Official Charts =

British record chart company

The Official UK Charts Company Limited
- Formation: 4 February 1998
- Founded at: Bristol, United Kingdom
- Type: Inter-professional organisation (private company limited by shares)
- Purpose: To award trending top singles
- Owners: British Phonographic Industry (BPI); Entertainment Retailers Association (ERA)
- Website: officialcharts.com
- Formerly called: Music Industry Chart Services Limited (1998–2001)

The Official UK Charts Company Limited (formerly Music Industry Chart Services Limited and Chart Information Network), trading as the Official Charts Company (OCC) or Official Charts, is a British inter-professional organisation that compiles various official record charts in the United Kingdom, Ireland and France.

In the United Kingdom, its charts include ones for singles, albums and films, with the data compiled from a mixture of downloads, physical media purchases and streaming. The OCC produces its charts by gathering and combining sales data from retailers through market researchers Kantar, and claims to cover 99% of the singles market and 95% of the album market, and aims to collect data from any retailer who sells more than 100 chart items per week.

The OCC is operated jointly by the British Phonographic Industry and the Entertainment Retailers Association (ERA) (formerly the British Association of Record Dealers (BARD)) and is incorporated as a private company limited by shares jointly owned by BPI and ERA. It was formed in 1990 as the Chart Information Network by the BBC, BARD, and the publishers of Music Week. CIN took over as compilers of the official UK charts in 1990, and the company has continued in that role, as the OCC, since 1994. Before then, the charts were produced by a succession of market research companies, beginning with the British Market Research Bureau (BMRB) in 1969 and Gallup, Inc. in 1983. Before the production of the "official" charts, various less comprehensive charts were produced, such as by magazine New Musical Express (NME) which began its chart in 1952. Some of these older charts (including NME's earliest singles charts) are now part of the official OCC canon.

== European charts ==
In 2017, the OCC made a five-year deal with the Irish Recorded Music Association (IRMA) to compile the Irish Singles Chart, Irish Albums Chart and other Irish charts on behalf of IRMA.

In December 2020, the OCC announced it was taking over the contract from German company GfK, in compiling the French music charts for Syndicat National de l'Édition Phonographique (SNEP)/National Union of Phonographic Producers (SCPP) with the OCC taking over on 1 January 2021.

== Chart synopsis ==
All of the OCC's charts are published weekly on Friday nights, and cover sales for the preceding week, Friday to Thursday. From 3 August 1969 until 5 July 2015, the chart week ran from Sunday to Saturday. In the United Kingdom, genre-specific charts include Official Dance Singles Chart Top 40, Official Hip Hop and R&B Singles Chart Top 40, Official Rock & Metal Singles Chart Top 40, Official Progressive Albums Chart Top 30 and the Asian Music Chart Top 40. It also produces charts such as the Official Independent Singles Chart Top 50, which tracks the progress of records (singles and albums) released on independent record labels or distributed by independent companies (not WMG/Sony/UMG) regardless of the genre/music released.

The Official Scottish Albums Chart Top 100 appears in listings on the Official Charts Company's site alongside its charts for the Republic of Ireland and Billboard's Top 20 singles and albums (with a link to the full Hot 100/albums 200 via billboard.com).

The Scottish chart is a listing reflecting how sales towards the UK Albums Chart are faring in Scotland. Until December 2020, the OCC published a Scottish singles chart on its website as well, though this chart may only be available via the UKChartsPlus newsletter. This subscription newsletter also includes the Official UK Top 100 Welsh Singles and Albums Charts, which serves the same purpose in Wales as the ones in Scotland, and the full UK Top 200 Albums chart.

The Official UK Top 200 Albums is just one of a number of 'industry only' charts not published for the general public, with others including UK Budget Album Chart (with any album including a low dealer price is excluded from the main album chart). Until the OCC changed its chart rules, and brought in criteria like the three-track rule (a maximum of three singles within the Top 100 by the same artist will be chart eligible), a Top 200 Singles chart was also published for people within the music industry.

The OCC also charts sales of DVDs and Blu-rays within the United Kingdom. While its music charts are now Friday to Thursday, its video charts remain Sunday to Saturday.

On 5 September 2008, the Official UK Charts Company rebranded itself as the Official Charts Company and introduced a new company logo. It later dropped the word 'Company' and became just "Official Charts".

From May 2012, a new chart was launched – the Official Streaming Chart. This counts audio streams from streaming services Spotify, Deezer, Blinkbox Music and Napster, amongst others. The chart is the first of its kind to rank streams from ad-funded and subscription services and the Official Streaming Chart Top 100 is now published weekly on the Official Charts website, and in music industry trade magazine Music Week.

In April 2015, the UK's first vinyl record chart of the modern era was launched by the Official Charts Company due to 'the huge surge of interest' in the sector. The chart was launched following the growth of the sector in the UK for the seventh year in a row.

In July 2015, Official Charts changed its chart methodology from traditional Sunday slot to the new Friday slot, effective on 10 July 2015 to coincide with the 'New Music Friday - Global Release Day' campaign set by IFPI which effective on 10 July 2015 as well.

Beginning in 2017, the Official Charts Company changed its methodology for calculating the Top 40, intending to more accurately reflect the rise in music streaming. Prior to January 2017, 100 streams counted as one 'sale' of a song. From January onward, the ratio became 150:1. Additionally, in June 2017, it was decided that after a record has spent at least 10 weeks on the chart, any track which has declined for three consecutive weeks will see its streams:sales ratio change from 150:1 to 300:1, in an attempt to accelerate their disappearance from the chart.

In mid-2019, the company also compiled the Asian Music Chart Top 40, alongside BritAsia TV. The chart highlights UK's biggest Asian songs of the week, based on sales and streams across a seven-day period.

In 2022, the success of Kate Bush's "Running Up That Hill" after its use in the fourth season of the Netflix series Stranger Things brought a challenge against the rules introduced in 2017. The rules were intended to prevent streaming of older songs potentially keeping them on the chart for years. This meant that Bush's song, which had been a Top 3 hit 37 years before, would have to obtain twice the streamings of Harry Styles' song "As It Was" to earn the same 'sales', despite easily being the most streamed and most downloaded song. The OCC granted a 'manual reset' in order to reflect the success of the revival of Bush's hit.

As well as genre-specific and music video charts, the OCC tracks purchases (DVDs/Blu-rays) and downloads of television programmes, films and sports/fitness videos from a range of retailers and online sites.

== The Chart Supervisory Committee ==
As the OCC is jointly operated by the BPI and the ERA, a Chart Supervisory Committee is in place with panel of representatives from both the record industry and from retailers. Five representatives from each sector are selected, with record companies represented by the major label corporations WMG, Sony Music and UMG alongside a couple of large independents, BMG Rights Management and PIAS Group. The Chart Supervisory Committee is the body which discusses and decides on any chart rule changes, whether it be changes to physical/digital formats or with the chart ratios ACR and SCR (Accelerated Chart Ratio and Standard Chart Ratio), with representatives meeting approximately four times a year.

== Awards ==
- The Number One Award for singles was first introduced by the OCC in December 2011, followed by the introduction of the Number One Award for albums in 2015.
- The Specialist Number One Awards were launched in January 2021. These awards recognize all number one albums and singles that have reached the top of any OCC chart, excluding the Official Singles and Official Albums charts, for any prior years.
- The Top 10 Award was inaugurated in March 2024, awarding artists for having a top 10 entry on the Official albums and singles charts for the first time.

== See also ==
- British Phonographic Industry (BPI)
- UK Albums Chart
- UK Album Downloads Chart
- UK singles chart
- UK Singles Downloads Chart
- UK Video Charts
