= TalkTalk TV Store =

UK-based video-on-demand service

- Developer: TalkTalk Group
- Initial release: 2007
- Operating system: Windows XP (x86 only); Windows Vista; Windows 7 Windows 8 Windows 8.1; Windows 10; Mac OS X (x86 only); Xbox 360; Xbox One; PS3 iOS; Android
- Type: Video on demand, TV, music streaming
- Website: talktalktvstore.co.uk

TalkTalk TV Store (formerly blinkbox) was a UK-based transactional (purchase and rental) video-on-demand (VoD) service available on Macintosh and Microsoft Windows computers, games consoles, tablet computers and Smart TVs. Content was generally streamed, with downloading possible on Windows PC/laptops. The blinkbox brand had been extended to companion services offering digital music and books.

Tesco bought an 80% stake in the business in 2011 as part of a move into digital content. On 8 January 2015 the company sold blinkbox Movies to TalkTalk Group, who stated they intended to integrate the service into its own range of services. Tesco sold blinkbox Music to Guvera on 26 January 2015, and confirmed it would close its blinkbox Books division at the end of February 2015. TalkTalk renamed the blinkbox Movies service in 2016. In May 2018 TalkTalk announced that they would close the service completely, with customers transferring to rival service Rakuten TV.

== History ==
The company was co-founded in 2006 by Michael Comish (he was blinkbox's chief executive officer until June 2013 when he became Tesco Group Digital Officer) and Australian entrepreneur and current Managing Partner in Brookfield's Private Equity Group based in London, Adrian Letts. Letts was chief operating officer of the blinkbox group of services and MD of the Movies and TV service, both former senior executives of Channel 4 and Vodafone respectively. blinkbox was launched in October 2007 with the backing of a number of venture capital firms.

On 20 April 2011, Tesco acquired an 80% stake in blinkbox from Eden Ventures and Nordic Venture Partners, intending to use the company to boost its digital entertainment offering. The Movies and TV service has around one million users per month.

In December 2014, Tesco was reported to be in negotiations with TalkTalk Group over the sale of blinkbox Movies, after talks with Vodafone fell through. The sale to TalkTalk was completed on 8 January 2015. TalkTalk eventually acquired the service along with a number of broadband customers, who transferred to the TalkTalk network.

In May 2018 TalkTalk announced that they would close the service completely for off-network customers who did not take TalkTalk's own broadband service where the more fully featured TalkTalk TV service is provided. Customers are being transferred to rival DTO service Rakuten TV.

== Services ==
TalkTalk TV Store has content deals with over 50 of the world's leading content producers including HBO, BBC Worldwide, Disney, Warner Bros., Universal Studios, Paramount Pictures, Sony Pictures Entertainment, FremantleMedia, All3Media, Revolver Entertainment and Aardman Animations.

In 2010 the company signed a deal with the Samsung Group allowing films to be streamed directly though any Internet@TV Samsung TVs. blinkbox also formed a content partnership with YouTube allowing the site to carry blinkbox films on its new Movies section. The service was also the first in the UK to offer streaming film content through Sony's PlayStation 3, and Microsoft's Xbox 360 consoles.

Rental content can be streamed directly to a Windows PC, Mac, Xbox 360, PlayStation 3 or Samsung Smart TV, and can be viewed any number of times within 48 hours. Buy-to-own content can be viewed without limit. The blinkbox app is built into all pre 2012 Samsung Smart TVs. Content is protected with Microsoft's Windows Media DRM digital rights management and requires Microsoft Silverlight to play. blinkbox cannot be used on Linux.

Historically blinkbox combined a free+pay model allowing users both to buy titles and also to watch free ad-supported titles. In December 2012 blinkbox stopped all ad-supported titles and shortly after launched www.clubcardtv.com, in which users with a Tesco Clubcard could watch titles free of charge, viewing advertisements targeted to them based on their buying habits.

On 28 October 2014, Tesco shut down the Clubcard TV service, stating that they were not getting the level of repeat usage that they had hoped for.

== Other services ==
In 2012, Tesco bought the online music streaming service WE7 and relaunched it in 2013 as blinkbox Music, aiming to compete with Spotify. blinkbox launched an ebook service, branded as blinkbox Books, in March 2014. blinkbox Music was sold to Guvera on 26 January 2015. After exclusive talks with Waterstones ended, Tesco also confirmed that blinkbox Books would close at the end of February 2015. Customers' purchases were transferred to Kobo.
