= Songtradr =

American B2B music licensing platform

- Industry: Music
- Founded: 2014; 12 years ago
- Founders: Paul Wiltshire, Helge Steffen
- Headquarters: Santa Monica, California, U.S.
- Website: songtradr.com

Songtradr is an American B2B music platform that helps to facilitate brands, content creators, and digital platforms in their use of music for licensing purposes. As of 2019, Songtradr was the largest music licensing platform in the world.

The platform offers products that can assist agencies, artists, and labels in the finding, licensing, and managing of music across various formats.

== Platform ==
Songtradr is an automated music licensing marketplace. As of 2019 it was the marketplace for the work of 400,000 artists across 190 countries. Songs represented on the platform are licensed by companies for advertisements, films, and television content, and recordings are searchable through the Songtradr database. Artists can upload their music to the platform and set licensing fees.

== Acquisitions and investments ==
In 2019, Songtradr acquired the creative licensing agency Big Sync Music. In 2020, Songtradr acquired Cuesongs, which was originally founded by singer-songwriter Peter Gabriel. In 2022 Cuesongs and Big Sync Music were merged.

In 2020, Songtradr announced it had invested AUS $1.42 million (approximately US $1.03m) in Jaxsta. This was followed up by a further AUS $3 million investment in April, 2022.

In March 2021, Songtradr acquired Song Zu, a sound design company with studios in Sydney and Singapore. In April, Songtradr acquired the music streaming platforms Pretzel and Tunefind.

In June 2021, Songtradr acquired MassiveMusic. The Music Network reported that "the new deal will see MassiveMusic's bespoke creative and strategic offerings integrated within Songtradr, giving brands and agencies access to a host of tech-enabled music licensing and sonic branding services under the same roof."

In July 2022, Songtradr acquired music metadata company Musicube.

In March 2023, Songtradr acquired London-headquartered B2B music company 7digital for £19.4 million (USD $23.4m).

In September 2023, Epic Games announced it was selling album-sales platform Bandcamp to Songtradr for an undisclosed amount. In October, after the acquisition, Bandcamp fired approximately half of its staff.
