= Project Panther Bidco =

British holding company

Project Panther Bidco Ltd.
- Company type: Private
- Industry: Holding company
- Founded: 29 December 2014; 11 years ago in London, United Kingdom
- Founder: Laurence Brown Jr
- Headquarters: The Broadgate Tower Third Floor, 20 Primrose Street, London, EC2A 2RS
- Key people: Juan Perez (director)
- Subsidiaries: Aspiro AB: TIDAL (until March 2021); WiMP

Project Panther Bidco Ltd. is a British-American holding company. The company was founded in 2014 by Roc Nation CEO, Laurence Brown Jr., but indirectly owned and controlled by rapper Jay-Z to purchase the assets of Norwegian technology company Aspiro. By purchasing Aspiro, the company became the sole owner of the music streaming services TIDAL and WiMP. WiMP merged into Tidal in March 2015. In March 2021, majority ownership in Tidal was acquired by Block, Inc.

== History ==
On 30 January 2015, it was announced that Project Panther Bidco Ltd. had bid SEK 464 million (£36 million, US$56 million) for the Norwegian technology Aspiro, developers of audio streaming services TIDAL and WiMP. Some minority shareholders of Aspiro opposed the takeover and argued that Project Panther Bidco undervalued the growth potential in their bid. On 13 March 2015, the acquisition was announced and finalized after being accepted by over 90 percent of the Aspiro shareholders.

In 2018, Project Panther Bidco, whose corporate headquarters are headquartered in New York City, hired a total of 238 workers, up from the 209 it had in the previous year.

== Subsidiaries ==
- Aspiro
  - TIDAL
  - WiMP
