= Azteca Now =

Mexican-American streaming video service owned by TV Azteca

azteca Now
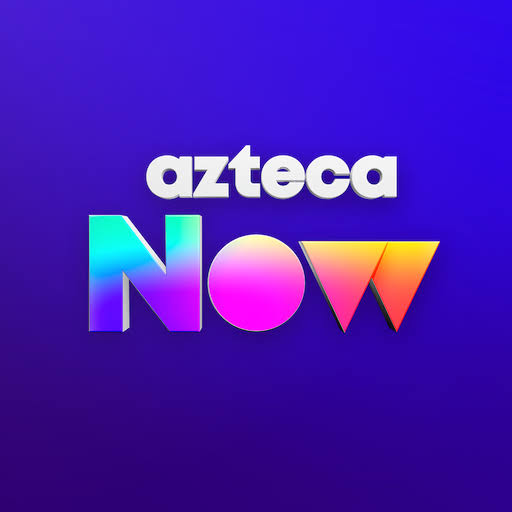
- Website type: OTT platform
- Available in: Spanish
- Headquarters: New York City, U.S.
- Area served: Canada; United States; Latin America; Europe
- Owners: ICARO Media Group; TV Azteca
- Products: Streaming media; Video on demand
- Services: Film distribution; Video distribution
- Website: aztecanow.com
- Launched: August 10, 2021
- Current status: Operating

Azteca Now (stylized: azteca Now) is a free-over-the-top streaming television service owned by Icaro Media Group and operated by TV Azteca. It was released on August 10, 2021, exclusively in several Latin American countries, the United States, Canada, as well as several European countries.

The platform was only released for Android and iOS. It includes a catalog of Original series, Telenovelas (from TV Azteca), Movies from the Golden Age of Mexican Cinema, Original movies, Lifestyle programs and adn40 news programming. On November 16, 2022, Azteca Now was launched in the Mexican market to compete mainly against TelevisaUnivision's Vix, and in the US market on January 17, 2023.

== History ==
At the beginning of 2021, TV Azteca announced the launch of its streaming-platform in collaboration with the New York-based company Icaro Media Group, aiming to compete with Televisa's Blim TV. It was officially launched on August 10, 2021 for both Latin America and Canada reaching a total coverage of approximately 100 million people. In September 2021, Azteca Now expanded into the European market, specifically in Germany, Spain and Portugal. On November 15, 2022, the launch of Azteca Now in Mexico was announced through the TV Azteca's pay television channels, and on November 16, it was officially released for Android and iOS. It was launched mainly because of the launch of Vix by TelevisaUnivision. On January 17, 2023 Azteca Now was launched in the US market targeting the Hispanic market.

== Programming ==
=== Telenovelas ===
Title	Genre	Episodes
Destino	Drama	105
Hombre tenías que ser	Drama; Romance	105
Los Rey	Drama; Romance	125
La otra cara del alma	Drama	130
Tanto amor	Drama; Romance	120

=== Series ===
Title	Genre	Episodes
Lucho en familia	Drama; Romance; Wrestling	
Drenaje profundo	Thriller; Crime; Science fiction	20
Demencia	Thriller; Horror	
Lo que la gente cuenta	Thriller	158

=== Movies ===
Title	Genre	Actors
El gavilán pollero	Romance	Pedro Infante; Ana María Villaseñor; Antonio Badú
La amargura de mi raza	Drama; Romance	Andrés García; Yolanda Liévana; Alicia Encinas
La hija del ministro	Romance	Luis Aguilar; Rosita Arenas; Víctor Parra
Águila o Sol		Cantinflas; Manuel Medel; Margarita Mora

== See also ==
- Vix+
