= Bandcamp =

American online music distributor

Bandcamp, Inc.

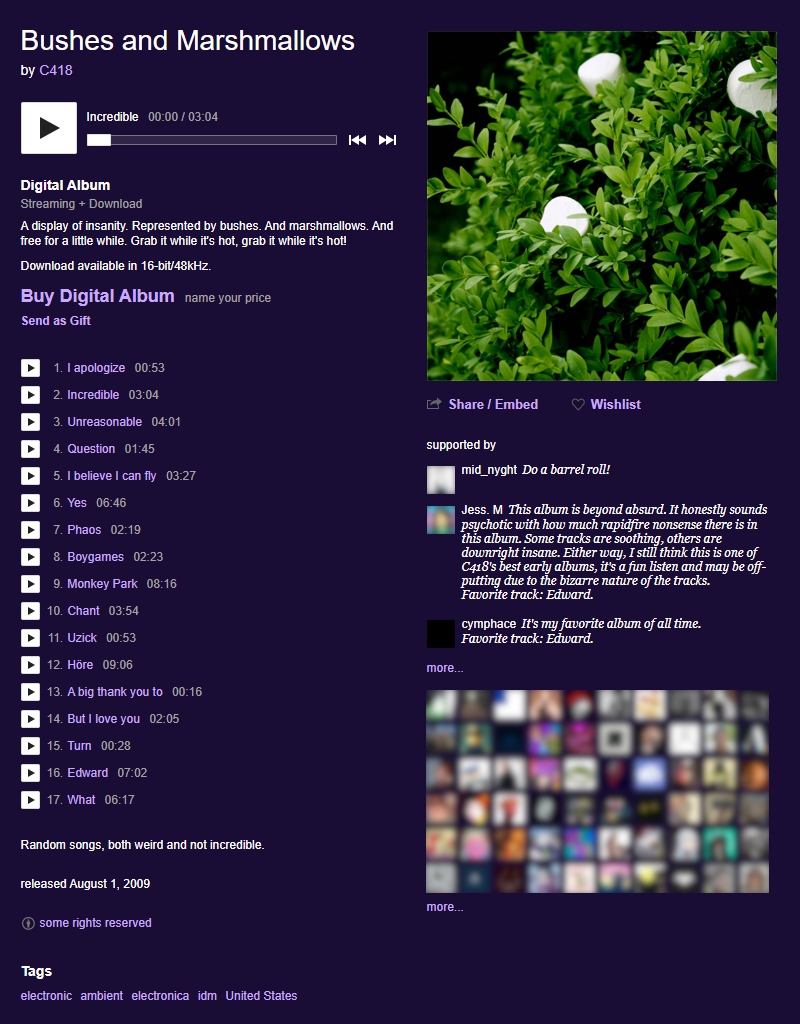
- Bandcamp page for a freely licensed album named Bushes and Marshmallows by C418
- Website type: Subsidiary
- Founded: 2008; 18 years ago
- Founders: Ethan Diamond; Shawn Grunberger; Joe Holt; Neal Tucker
- Industry: Music streaming, music purchasing
- Parent: Epic Games (2022–2023); Songtradr (2023–present)
- Website: bandcamp.com

Bandcamp is an American online music distribution platform, founded in 2008, with an office and record store in Oakland, California. It was acquired by Epic Games in March 2022 and sold to the music-licensing company Songtradr in October 2023; about half of Bandcamp staff did not receive offers to continue under the new owner.

== History ==
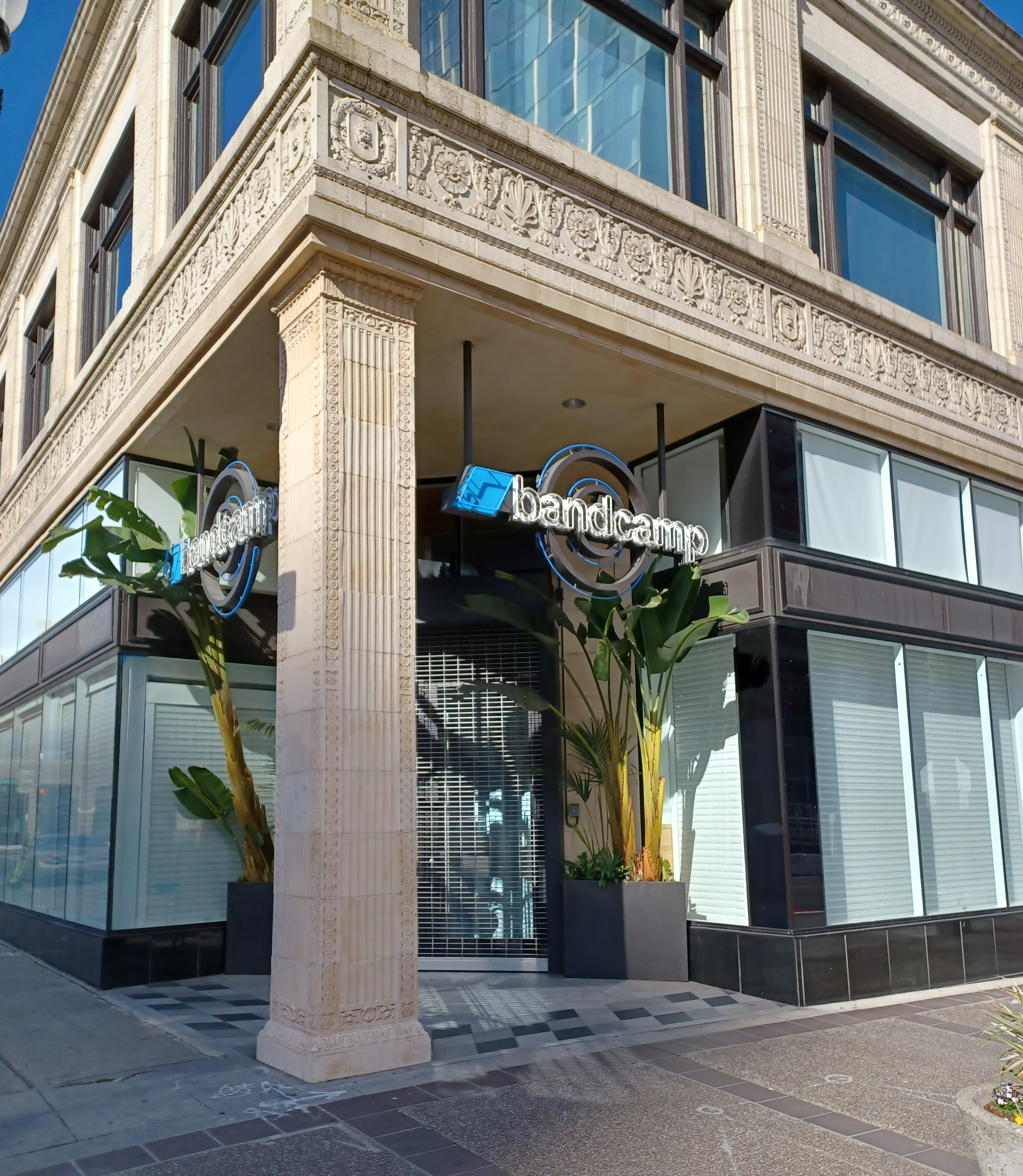
Bandcamp office and record store in Oakland, California

Bandcamp was founded in 2008 by Oddpost co-founder Ethan Diamond (CEO) and programmers Shawn Grunberger (CFO), Joe Holt and Neal Tucker. In 2019, Bandcamp opened its first office and record store in Oakland, California.

In 2010, the site enabled embedding in other websites and shared links on social media sites.

As of August 2020, half of Bandcamp's revenue was from sales for physical products.

In November 2020, Bandcamp launched Bandcamp Live, a ticketed live-streaming service for artists. The service is an integrated feature of the Bandcamp website. Fees on tickets were waived until March 31, 2021, and became 10% from then.

Bandcamp provides vinyl pressing services for artists. After a 50-artist pilot in 2020, the company opened limited access to 10,000 artists in early 2021 with plans for further expansion. Their fans preorder the pressing rather than having the artist fund it upfront. Bandcamp lets artists set their own price. The company's two million vinyl sales in 2020 doubled that of 2019.

In March 2022, Epic Games acquired Bandcamp; the companies said the service would continue to operate as a stand-alone marketplace.

Bandcamp's employees voted to form a union via the Office and Professional Employees International Union in March 2023. On September 28, 2023, Epic Games announced that it was laying off 870 people, roughly 16% of its workforce. As part of this, Bandcamp was sold to Songtradr, another music platform. According to an Epic Games spokesperson, Songtradr incrementally offered employment to the Bandcamp staff.

Following Epic’s September 2023 layoffs and the sale to Songtradr, reporting indicated roughly half of Bandcamp employees were not extended offers by the buyer; staff also reported access issues during the transition period.

In an internal email, Songtradr's CEO, Paul Wiltshire, said that Bandcamp's financial state had "not been healthy" due to increased operating costs over steady revenues, despite the site's continuous profitability. In response to the layoffs, users and artists of the platform expressed anxiety about its future. As of December 2023, Songtradr had not formally recognized the Bandcamp union.

In January 2026, Bandcamp officially announced a ban on all AI-generated music on the platform. In a Reddit post, Bandcamp announced that "any use of AI tools to impersonate other artists or styles" would be banned on the website going forward and all content suspected to be AI-generated would be removed.

== Business model ==
Artists and labels upload music to Bandcamp and control how they sell it, setting their own prices, offering users the option to pay more, and selling merchandise.

The company takes a 15% commission on sales made from their website, which drops to 10% after an artist's sales surpass US$5,000, plus payment processing fees.

Downloads are offered in lossy formats MP3 (LAME, 320k or V0), AAC and Ogg Vorbis, and in lossless formats FLAC, ALAC, WAV and AIFF.

In 2021 Bandcamp expanded a vinyl pressing program that lets artists crowdfund production runs; industry coverage noted fans bought about two million vinyl LPs on the platform in 2020, double 2019’s total.

== Charity ==
Starting during the COVID-19 pandemic, in 2020 Bandcamp periodically waived its revenue share on designated “Bandcamp Fridays.” Media reported the initiative raised more than US$40 million for artists in 2020 and continued into 2021 with additional dates.

In response to the protests that took place following the murder of George Floyd and other African Americans who had died from police violence, Bandcamp announced that for 24 hours on June 19, 2020 they would donate 100% of profits to the NAACP Legal Defense Fund.

Also, in response to the Southern California wildfires of January 2025, Bandcamp announced that they would donate all of their proceeds from February 7 to MusiCares to support those affected by it.

== Notable artists and labels ==
Bandcamp gained much attention in July 2010 when Amanda Palmer, Low Places and Bedhed gave up their record labels and started selling albums on Bandcamp, using Twitter for promotion. Inspired by the success of the band Cults on Bandcamp, Will Toledo initially released the majority of his discography exclusively on Bandcamp.

Several indie game soundtracks have been published on Bandcamp, such as the soundtracks for Terraria and Minecraft.

In December 2014, Bandcamp for Labels was launched. Popular independent labels such as Sub Pop, Fat Wreck Chords, Relapse Records and Epitaph Records launched their own Bandcamp pages. In November 2019, Peter Gabriel added his complete solo catalog to Bandcamp. On June 18, 2020, Björk published her discography on the platform. In December, UK label Warp joined Bandcamp; this made records by Hudson Mohawke, Aphex Twin, Kelela and other artists available on the platform. On October 21, 2021, Radiohead published their discography on the platform. Bandcamp is also a go-to site for browsing and purchasing ambient music from well-known artists like Michael Stearns, Robert Rich and Steve Roach.

== Bandcamp Daily ==
In the summer of 2016, their editorial content was expanded by launching Bandcamp Daily, an online music publication about artists on the platform. The publication is based in New York. Its managing editor was JJ Skolnik, a writer for Pitchfork, BuzzFeed and The New York Times, as well as former author of punk zines. Among Bandcamp Daily's columnists have been writers for Wired, Vice, NPR Music, Pitchfork and Paste.

On August 4, 2017, the staff of Bandcamp Daily donated all of the day's sales proceeds to the Transgender Law Center, a civil rights organization for transgender people.

By February 2018, the audience of Bandcamp Daily had increased 84% since the previous year.
