= Woolgoolga, New South Wales =

Woolgoolga Wiilgulga (Kumbainggar)
- Town
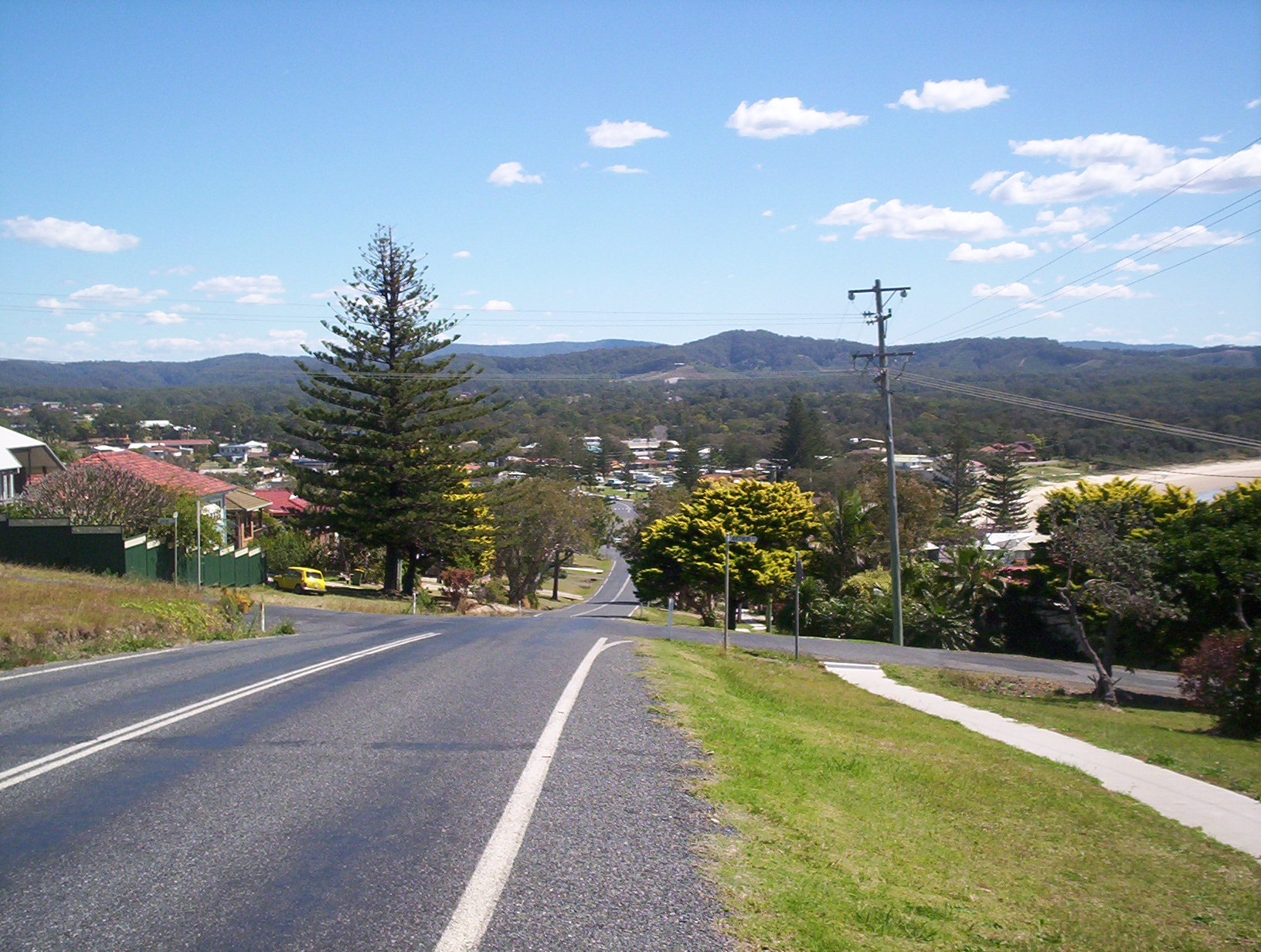
- Looking down to Woolgoolga from the headland

- Coordinates: 30°07′S 153°12′E
- Country: Australia
- State: New South Wales
- LGA: City of Coffs Harbour
- Location: 555 km (345 mi) NE of Sydney; 365 km (227 mi) S of Brisbane; 25 km (16 mi) NNE of Coffs Harbour; 59 km (37 mi) SSE of Grafton

Government
  - State electorate: Coffs Harbour
  - Federal division: Page
- Elevation: 8 m (26 ft)

Population
  - Total: 6,151 (2021 census)
- Time zone: UTC+10 (AEST)
  - Summer (DST): UTC+11 (AEDT)
- Postcode: 2456
- County: Fitzroy

Woolgoolga (/wʊlɡʊlɡə/; Kumbainggar: Wiilgulga), locally nicknamed Woopi (/wʊpi/), is a town on the Mid North Coast of New South Wales, Australia. It is on the Pacific Highway, approximately 550 km north of Sydney and 365 km south of Brisbane. The closest city to Woolgoolga is Coffs Harbour, which lies 24.8 km to the south. Woolgoolga has two beaches on the Pacific Ocean. The area has long been a centre of banana growing in New South Wales, but this industry has declined in the face of competition from Queensland. Recent times have seen many banana plantations replaced by blueberries after banana sales slumped in the late 1990s. The town has a large Punjabi Sikh community.

== Demographics ==
Percentage of people in each Australian Bureau of Statistics (ABS) statistical area 1 (SA1) of Woolgoolga and nearby Sandy Beach and Safety Beach who reported speaking Punjabi at home in the 2021 census. 0–5% 5–10% 10–15% 15–20% 20–25% 25–30% 30–35% 35–40%

Woolgoolga had a population of 6,151 people in 2021, including 283 indigenous persons and 4,331 Australian-born persons. The median age of all persons is 45 years. Notably, from the Census data, 1,056 persons (17.2%) speak Punjabi at home, 1,059 persons (17.2%) practise Sikhism and 550 persons (8.9%) were of Indian descent.

== History ==
Permanent European settlement occurred in the 1870s when the Hofmeier family moved to the area to make their selections. Prior to this, the area was inhabited by the Gumbaynggirr Aboriginal people. The name of the town derives from the word Wiilgulga, which was used by the local Aboriginal people to describe the area, and the Black Apple trees that grew there. The name "Woogoolga" was gazetted in 1888, and changed to the current name of Woolgoolga in 1966.

Timbergetting and sawmilling was established in 1883. A government jetty was constructed in 1892 upon which tramways were laid. These tramways led to sawmills in the town which in turn were connected by light railway to the Jesse Simpson Range forest areas. The jetty was demolished over a prolonged period from 1952 to 1956.

Woolgoolga was an early centre of Sikh migration to Australia. Sikhs had migrated to New South Wales and Queensland prior to the imposition of the prohibition of non-European migration under the White Australia Policy in 1901 and many of them then led a marginalised life on the north coast of New South Wales and in southeastern Queensland. Some Sikhs began to settle in Woolgoolga during World War II, because war-time labour shortages led to a relaxation of the previous prohibition of non-European labour in the banana industry. After the war they were able to acquire leasehold and freehold banana plantations. Woolgoolga had the largest regional Sikh/Punjabi population in Australia, and they are now said to own 90% of the banana farms and are also diversifying into blueberries.

Historical population
Year	Pop.	±%
1961	1,109	—
1966	1,199	+8.1%
1971	1,320	+10.1%
1976	1,601	+21.3%
1981	2,081	+30.0%
1986	2,346	+12.7%
1991	3,660	+56.0%
1996	3,772	+3.1%
2001	3,793	+0.6%
2006	4,356	+14.8%
2011	4,718	+8.3%
2016	4,961	+5.2%
2021	5,797	+16.9%
Source: Australian Bureau of Statistics data.

== Tourism ==
Woolgoolga's coastal location and temperate climate make it a popular tourist destination. The town has less traffic as it was bypassed by the Pacific Highway. Many travellers break their journey in Woolgoolga.

The headland at Woolgoolga is a great elevated platform for watching the migrating whales as they journey to warmer waters for calving.

The Sydney 2000 Olympics torch relay passed through Woolgoolga, as did the 2006 Commonwealth Games Queen's Baton Relay.

In 2011, the area hosted Rally Australia, the 10th round of the World Rally Championship. It hosted stages 22 and 25 at Plum Pudding.

=== Notable shipwreck ===
On 8 March 1893 a 39-metre vessel named Buster was driven ashore during a storm from the south-east. Buster's anchor cable snapped and its holding chains failed. The vessel eventually beached stern-first 200 metres down the beach just south of the Woolgoolga Lake mouth. The 310 ton vessel became a total wreck at the mouth of Woolgoolga Lake. Buster was built in Nova Scotia, Canada in 1884. It arrived at Woolgoolga from Sydney in February 1893 to load timber bound for New Zealand.

In May 2019 a group of people drove a stolen black Mitsubishi Pajero onto the beach and did irreparable damage to the shipwreck. The perpetrators broke off the most prominent visible parts of Buster. The car was found abandoned at a nearby village.

== Curryfest ==
Curryfest is the largest single gathering for the Woolgoolga community. It is an annual celebration of Woolgoolga's Punjabi heritage. Inaugurated in 2006 (with the help of local celebrity Jack Thompson and the Woolgoolga and Northern Beaches Chamber of Commerce), it is a celebration of the culture of the local Sikh community and is sponsored by the Regional Australian Bank. In 2009 it became incorporated into its own identity. It still uses the name and backing of the Chamber of Commerce but now partially pays for the event itself, including through the introduction of a two-dollar entry fee in 2009. Approximately 180 stalls are set up with around 16,000 attendants.

=== Background ===
Woolgoolga is home to Australia's largest Sikh/Punjabi population and has two Gurdwaras (temples). The festival seeks to promote culture and business interests from this demographic in Australia. It was used as a case study for how event management has changed in the 21st century.

=== Events ===
Events include: cooking (in 2019 the celebrity chef was Justine Schofield) dancing, a kids' entertainment area, mindfulness/meditation space and a large stage for musical entertainment. Prior to the actual event there is an assortment of activities which encourage out-of-towners to make a vacation out of the festival.

The scheduled 26 September 2020 festivity was canceled due to the coronavirus pandemic and restricted 20-person outdoor gatherings.

== Sporting clubs ==
- Woolgoolga Seahorses (The Mighty Seahorses), a Rugby league club whose home ground is situated at the local high school's fields. They play in Group 2 Rugby League.
- Woolgoolga United Football Club, a Soccer club situated at High Street.
- Northern Beaches Blues Football Club, is an Australian Rules Football club located in Woolgoolga to contest the AFL North Coast competition. The Northern Beaches play their home games at Wiigulga Sports Complex. Their player catchment includes Korora, Woolgoolga, Red Rock and Orara Valley.
- Woolgoolga District Netball Association, formed in 2006 for ages 5+. WDNA has a local competition as well as representative participation in the Netball NSW State Age Championships. The clubhouse and courts are located on the corner of Nightingale and Scarborough Streets.
- WASP (Woolgoolga Area Surfing Posse), a local boardriders club that holds annual competitions around the area.
- Woolgoolga Surf Life Saving Club, as the name states, a Surf Lifesaving club that has been around since the 1930s, which patrols Woolgoolga Beach. It caters from ages 5–14 in Nippers, and can take part in carnivals held around the area. Ages 15+ can patrol the main beach, if they have a Surf Rescue Certificate or Bronze Medallion.
- Northern Districts Cricket Club playing in the Coffs Harbour and Districts competition.
- Northern Beaches Hockey Club, a hockey club that plays in Coffs Harbour near the BCU International Stadium.
- Woolgoolga Athletics Club, a club that trains and competes in track and field, at the local high school oval across the summer months.
- Woolgoolga White Pointers, a former Rugby Union club whose home ground is Centennial Oval

== Notable current and former residents ==
- Air Marshal Sir Charles Read (1919–2014) former RAAF Chief of the Air Staff retired in Woolgoolga.
- Actor Jack Thompson. Thompson has played a vital role in the organisation and running of community events both in Woolgoolga and surrounding regions.
- Emma Moffatt, two-time women's triathlon world champion, attended Woolgoolga High School
- Technology entrepreneur Claes Loberg grew up in Woolgoolga and attended the local public schools.

== Education ==
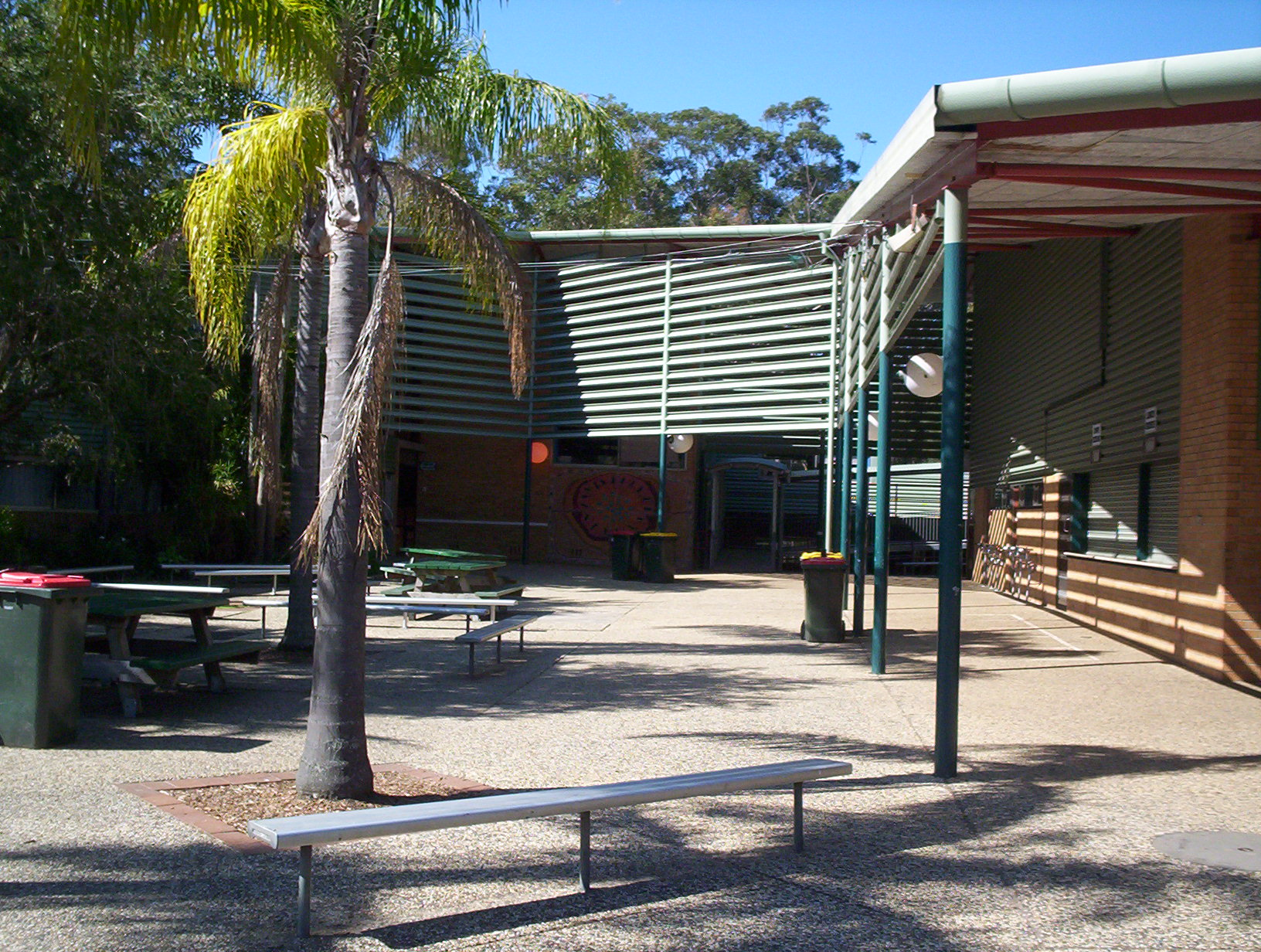
Woolgoolga High School

Woolgoolga has three schools:

- Woolgoolga High School (opened 1981) is a public high school.
- Woolgoolga Public School (opened 1884) is a public primary school.
- St Francis Xavier Primary School (opened 1994) is a Catholic primary school.

== Library and cultural facilities ==
Library

- Coffs Harbour City Library and Information Service – Woolgoolga branch

Museums

- Woolgoolga RSL Sub-branch Museum

== Local media ==
- Woopi News – Community magazine, hard copy, free
- The Coffs Coast Advocate, digital subscription only
- Fresh FM – Woolgoolga's Own Radio 87.6 fm Low powered radio; streaming option

== Transport ==
- Forest Coach Lines runs between Coffs Harbour and Grafton.
- Greyhound Australia

Woolgoolga Taxi Service services the local area.

The nearest station is Coffs Harbour railway station. The nearest airport is Coffs Harbour Regional Airport.
