= Tunefind =

Website index of music featured in TV, movies, and video games

- Website type: Music database
- Available in: English
- Owner: Songtradr
- Creators: Matt Garlinghouse, James Byers
- Website: tunefind.com
- Registration: Required for contributions
- Launched: 2005; 21 years ago
- Current status: Active

Tunefind is an American music database website that catalogs songs featured in television series, films, and video games. Founded in 2005 by Matt Garlinghouse and James Byers, the platform combines crowdsourced user contributions with official data from music supervisors to build its database of song placements across visual media. In April 2021, Tunefind was acquired by Songtradr, a B2B music licensing marketplace.

== History ==
=== Founding and early development ===
Tunefind originated in 2005 when Matt Garlinghouse, then working as a renewable energy developer, was unable to identify songs he had heard during episodes of Scrubs and The West Wing airing in the same week. One of the songs was "Closer" by Joshua Radin, which appeared on an episode of Scrubs in January 2005. Garlinghouse found that no comprehensive online resource existed for identifying music in television, and built the site as a weekend hobby project with co-founder James Byers.

The site initially covered only ten television shows, with Garlinghouse manually identifying and entering the music himself. As an online community built up organically, Garlinghouse added crowdsourcing features to allow users to submit and verify song information. In 2010, Tunefind launched its first developer-facing API, enabling third-party applications and websites to access its data.

=== Growth ===
In 2017, Tunefind acquired France-based Heard On TV, another television music identification site, as part of an international expansion strategy. Tunefind reported a growth rate exceeding 60 percent year-over-year at the time of the acquisition, with over three million unique monthly visitors.

By 2021, the platform had grown to serve over 30 million unique visitors per year and partnered with more than 250 music supervisors worldwide.

=== Songtradr acquisition ===
On April 27, 2021, Songtradr acquired Tunefind for an undisclosed sum. The deal was Songtradr's fourth acquisition that year, following purchases of Song Zu, Cuesongs, and Pretzel. Songtradr CEO Paul Wiltshire described Tunefind as "a key trusted industry resource for music use across all major entertainment formats". Tunefind continues to operate under its own brand, led by managing director Amanda Byers.

== Features and operation ==
=== Database and crowdsourcing ===
Tunefind maintains a database of songs cataloged by the specific television episode, film, or video game in which they appear. The platform's content is sourced through two methods: official song lists submitted directly by music supervisors, and crowdsourced contributions from registered users. Songs submitted by music supervisors are marked as verified, while user-submitted entries go through a community voting process in which other users confirm or dispute their accuracy. Music supervisors with accounts on the site are distinguished by verified checkmarks and can respond directly to user questions about song selections.

The site offers song previews, scene descriptions, and links to streaming and purchase platforms for each listed track. Users can browse content by show, film, or video game title, with television series organized by season and episode.

=== API and data services ===
Tunefind's API, first launched in 2010, provides data to a range of third-party applications and industry partners. In 2017, the company introduced a tiered API product with multiple access levels designed for different use cases, from independent app developers to enterprise clients. Clients of Tunefind's data services have included Plex and Chartmetric.

=== Billboard and The Hollywood Reporter chart ===
In May 2017, Tunefind announced a partnership with The Hollywood Reporter–Billboard Media Group to provide data for the monthly Top TV Songs chart. The chart ranks songs featured on television using a formula that combines Tunefind's song and show data with Shazam tags and sales and streaming information tracked by Nielsen Music/MRC Data. The chart is published monthly on both Billboard and The Hollywood Reporter websites.

== See also ==
- Shazam (application)
- Music supervision
- Synchronization license
