= Claes Loberg =

Technology entrepreneur and designer

- Born: 21 January 1970; Sweden
- Died: 15 June 2023 (aged 53)
- Occupations: CEO & Co-Founder Bounty Media

Claes J M Loberg (21 January 1970 - 15 June 2023) was a Swedish born Australian technology entrepreneur and designer who founded the music streaming and downloading service Guvera. in 2008, and Zero Party Deep Data Platform, Bounty Media in 2019, funded by SOSV in Singapore. In June 2023, Loberg died from a sudden aortic dissection.

== Early life and education ==
Loberg was born in Sweden on January 21, 1970 and grew up in Woolgoolga, New South Wales, and attended Woolgoolga High School. He was educated in fine arts at Lund University Sweden, Business & Leadership at London Business School United Kingdom, and International Business at the Graduate school of business at QUT.

== Career ==
In 1994, Loberg founded his first company, Hyro.com, which was listed on the Australian Stock Exchange (ASX:HYO) and ranked as one of the biggest IT and web development companies in Australia, with offices both domestically and in China and Thailand.

Loberg was one of the founding team of Branded Content Marketing Association (BCMA) in London in 2004, assisting with partners in Australia and the USA. BCMA was dedicated to business-related research, specifically the concept of advertiser brands distributing versus disrupting content.

Loberg founded Guvera in 2008 with colleague Brad Christiansen. In 2010, Guvera was launched as an online MP3 site. Loberg and his co-founders helped raise an initial $20 million investment for Guvera through private equity firm AMMA.

Guvera was ranked by Billboard Magazine as one of the best digital music start-ups of 2010.

Loberg was listed as Ernst & Young’s Entrepreneur of the Year in 2011, after winning the Technology category in Australia.

In 2021, in was reported that Loberg had also co-founded the Bounty Media Zero Party Deep Data platform with Jake Denney in Singapore in 2019, after securing funding from venture capital company SOSV

== Guvera ==
In 2008 Loberg, Brad Christiansen set up Guvera Limited in Robina, Australia. In January 2010, the company launched its legal music streaming and download service Guvera. In July 2016, it was reported that Loberg would become CEO.

Guvera, acquired Blinkbox Music from UK retail chain Tesco in January 2015. Then Blinkbox was closed six months later as reported in BRW Australia.

Guvera, launched in India in 2014, at an event in Mumbai as reported in Billboard.

As of May 2017, Guvera has shut down all operations across all markets.
