= Josh Greenberg =

American entrepreneur (1987–2015)

- Born: April 17, 1987; Saint Petersburg, Florida
- Died: July 19, 2015 (aged 28); Gainesville, Florida
- Known for: Founder of Grooveshark

Josh Greenberg (April 17, 1987 – July 19, 2015) was an American entrepreneur and one of the co-founders of music streaming service Grooveshark.

== Biography ==
=== Career ===
Greenberg founded Grooveshark as a 19-year-old freshman at the University of Florida in March 2006 with co-founders Andrés Barreto and Sam Tarantino. The latter, Greenberg's best friend, became the company's Chief executive officer (CEO). Greenberg operated as Chief technology officer (CTO) of Grooveshark from the inception of the on-demand music service in 2006 until his death in July 2015. Greenberg's duties as CTO were related to engineering, infrastructure, creative, data, and community. Greenberg was also a co-founder and board member of a Florida startup called TapShield, that was developed in 2014 to allow users of the company's mobile application to alert emergency responders and authorities about criminal activities via mobile devices.

In a recorded interview, Greenberg said "Grooveshark is essentially the YouTube for music ... Everything they're trying to do for video, we are trying to do with audio. Our goal is not to disrupt, our goal is to create... Something that fills a need. It is challenging". At a business conference, he said "I think at the end of the day it's all about the people: If you want to create something great - a company, an application, anything like that - you're going to need to be connected ... [reaching] a place like this is well worth the trip".

Grooveshark, with 40 million users and 145 employees at its peak, began to face a string of lawsuits from the three major conglomerates - Universal, Sony and Warner Music. The website shut down to avoid hundreds of millions of dollars in potential penalties, after reaching a settlement with the labels to avoid a jury trial.

=== Death and legacy ===
Greenberg was found dead in bed by his girlfriend who had returned to their shared home in Gainesville, Florida on July 19, 2015. The Gainesville Police Department stated during the preliminary investigation that neither foul play nor suicide was suspected in his death, despite his dying from unknown reasons. Greenberg's mother said he was in full health at the time of his death, and dismissed the possibility he had taken his own life in the aftermath of the company's collapse, claiming "he was more relieved than depressed about the settlement, as it had ended the long-looming lawsuit." The later autopsy failed to determine an actual cause of death.

On April 18, 2016, Greenberg was honored in a small celebration, the first annual Josh Greenberg Day, at the Gainesville Area Chamber of Commerce on University Avenue. The event was one day after what would have been Greenberg's 29th birthday.

== See also ==
- List of unsolved deaths
