= Phil Quartararo =

American music industry executive (1956–2023)

- Born: January 7, 1956; Brooklyn, New York, U.S.
- Died: November 22, 2023 (aged 67); Los Angeles, California, U.S.
- Other name: Phil Q
- Occupation: Music industry executive

Philip Michael Quartararo (January 7, 1956 – November 22, 2023) was an American music industry executive. He was the president and chairman of The Hello Group, and held positions as CEO at Virgin Records, Warner Bros. Records, and EMI, and was involved in the careers of recording artists such as Linkin Park, Josh Groban, Spice Girls, U2, and Yoshiki. Quartararo was known as a defender of artist rights. He spoke out on the fight against music piracy and restoring the value of music. Quartararo was regarded as one of the most promotion-minded executives in the music business and was regarded as a thought leader on the subject of partnership between brands and artists.

== Biography ==
=== Early life ===
Philip Michael Quartararo was born in Brooklyn, New York, on January 7, 1956. His work in the music business began at an early age, booking music acts out of his bedroom while he was still in high school. He attended Chaminade High School in Mineola, New York, where he booked the sockhop bands. He attended Syracuse University where his college roommates were John Sykes and Rob Light. Sykes went on to become co-founder of MTV and VH1 cable networks, as well as hold senior positions at record labels and radio broadcast networks. Light went on to become managing partner and head of music for CAA. Quartararo graduated from the S.I. Newhouse School of Public Communications in 1977.

Quartararo began his career in the record industry as a local radio promotion manager for A&M Records from 1977 to 1981. He moved on to become a regional promotion manager for RCA Records from 1981 to 1983. His executive breakthrough came when he was hired as senior vice-president of promotion and marketing for Island Records from 1982 to 1986, where he was instrumental in introducing U2 in America.

=== Virgin Records America ===
In 1986, Quartararo was recruited by Richard Branson as part of the team to launch Virgin Records America, along with executives Jordan Harris and Jeff Ayeroff. In 1992, he became president and CEO of Virgin Records America. At Virgin he was influential in the recording careers of Smashing Pumpkins, Lenny Kravitz, Paula Abdul, After 7, Rolling Stones, Janet Jackson, and Ben Harper. He is credited with the marketing blitz that launched the Spice Girls in the U.S., the success of which brought him the attention of Warner Bros. Records.

=== Warner Bros. Records ===
In 1997, Quartararo was recruited as president of Warner Bros. Records, which was ranked #1 out of world's largest record companies. At Warner Bros., he worked with artists including Linkin Park, Josh Groban, Madonna, Stevie Nicks, Cher, Wilco, Eric Clapton, Red Hot Chili Peppers, Faith Hill, Goo Goo Dolls, and Green Day.

=== EMI Music ===
In 2002, Quartararo was hired to become executive vice-president of EMI Music and president of EMI marketing. Quartararo reorganized EMI, shifting its focus from sales and distribution to marketing. He directed the marketing and launch of recordings of Coldplay, Norah Jones, Keith Urban, Blake Shelton, Trace Adkins, RBD, and Beach Boys, as well as marketing the estate catalogs of Frank Sinatra, Beatles, Les Paul, and Dean Martin.

=== Other endeavors ===
In late 2007, Quartararo left EMI to work with start-up companies focused on digital music distribution. In 2009, he started his own firm, Tripod Partners, which has worked with various music industry companies such as Beta Records TV, global online talent search Avon Voices, the Shazam music discovery app, and the Guvera music streaming service. He was associated with the talent management firm The Collective, and was a principal at the consultancy QP2 Group. Quartararo also managed Yoshiki, singer-songwriter Brandon Howard, and heavy metal group XJapan. Quartararo was executive producer of the eight-hour PBS miniseries The Soundtrack of Our Lives. He also served as executive producer of the double Grammy Award-winning album, Les Paul And Friends: A Tribute To A Legend. At the 2013 Midem conference, Quartararo was referenced by industry media for his observation, "The old record business didn't get killed. It committed suicide. The industry didn't listen to its consumers."

== Philanthropy ==
Quartararo sat on the boards of the Grammy Foundation, City of Hope, Cedar Sinai, Recording Industry Association of America (RIAA), T J Martell Foundation, Pacific Science Center, State of California Board for Engineers and Surveyors, and Syracuse University's S.I. Newhouse School of Public Communications.

Quartararo was recognized for his philanthropic contributions with awards that included City of Hope's "Spirit of Life" Award, Russell Simmons Award for Diversity and Equality, the Vincent Testaverde Award for Spinal Injury, Sons of Italy Award, and Syracuse University's 40 at 40 Award.

== Illness and death ==
Phil Quartararo died from pancreatic cancer in Los Angeles on November 22, 2023, at the age of 67.

== Music industry honors ==
Quartararo was named by Billboard magazine as Music Executive of the Year (2001), and received the NARAS Governors Award.
