= Aspiro =

Norwegian technology company

Aspiro AB
- Company type: Subsidiary
- Industry: Music
- Founded: 1998; 28 years ago
- Founders: Jörgen Adolfsson; Christer Månsson; Klas Hallqvist
- Headquarters: Oslo, Norway
- Area served: Worldwide
- Key people: Andy Chen (CEO); Chris Hart (CFO)
- Products: Tidal; WiMP (defunct)
- Number of employees: 120
- Parent: Block, Inc. (86.8%)
- Website: aspiro.com

Aspiro AB was a Norwegian-based, legally Swedish-domiciled technology company founded in 1998. The company mainly provided subscription-based lossless music streaming services under its two brands, Tidal and WiMP. The company was headquartered in Norway, with additional offices in Poland, Sweden, Denmark, and Germany.

As of the end of December 2014, Aspiro's music streaming services had 500,000 paying customers.

== History ==
Aspiro AB was founded in 1998 by Jörgen Adolfsson, Christer Månsson, and Klas Hallqvist, who were colleagues in the mobile phone industry, initially at the Swedish mobile phone company Europolitan. The three founded Aspiro after observing the impact of the Wireless Application Protocol on mobile communication while they were working at Telenor Mobil's Value-Creating Services division in Oslo. The company originally focused on many different mobile technologies not limited to music streaming.

The company made its initial public offering on the Stockholm Stock Exchange's New Market in May 2000 and later began trading on the main market in June 2001. In 2009, the company developed its first music streaming service, which eventually became its core business.

In January 2015, Aspiro received a $56 million takeover bid from Project Panther Bidco Ltd., a company indirectly owned by rapper Jay-Z. Despite some opposition from minority shareholders who believed the bid undervalued Aspiro's growth potential, the acquisition was accepted by over 90 percent of the shareholders and was finalized in March 2015. Subsequently, the music streaming services WiMP and Tidal merged under the Tidal name.
