= Lo que la gente cuenta =

- Genre: Anthology series; Thriller; Horror
- Created by: Alejandro Rodríguez
- Written by: Armando García; José Ramón Menéndez; David Mascareño
- Directed by: Santiago Sánchez; Hatuey Viveros
- Creative director: Alejandro Rodríguez
- Country of origin: Mexico
- Original language: Spanish
- No. of seasons: 10
- No. of episodes: 158

Production
- Camera setup: Multi-camera
- Running time: 45-1 hour
- Production company: TV Azteca

Original release
- Network: Azteca Trece [Uno] (20 November 2005–2019); Azteca 7 (2019–2022)
- Release: November 20, 2005

Lo que la gente cuenta (in English: What people say [tell]) is a Mexican horror, thriller and anthology series created and produced by Alejandro Rodríguez for TV Azteca since November 20, 2005. The series recreates popular Mexican horror legends, It first premiered on Azteca Trece and then revived and transferred to Azteca 7 in 2019.

On August 31, 2021, during the press presentation of Un día para vivir, it was announced that the series was renewed for a ninth season, which is scheduled to premiere on October 11, 2021, and its production began on August 23, 2021.

== Plot ==
The program focuses on horror and suspense stories based on real events, only the names of the characters were changed and also a little change of the story. Each episode of the series presents a story in which the main characters encounter multiple paranormal manifestations and strange beings, and have to find a way to get rid of them.

== Other versions ==
- Que as pessoas dizem: Brazilian version released in 2007.
- Más allá del miedo: version made from 2019 to 2021.
