= Tidal (service) =

Subscription-based music streaming service

- Search screen of Tidal for iOS app
- Developer: Block, Inc.
- Type: Audio streaming
- Launched: October 28, 2014; 12 years ago
- Platforms: Android; Android Auto; Android TV; Amazon Alexa; CarPlay; HEOS; iOS; macOS; Tesla; Tizen OS; tvOS; WatchOS; WiiM; Windows
- Availability: 61 countries
- Website: tidal.com

Tidal (stylized TIDAL) is a Norwegian-American music streaming service, launched in 2014 by Aspiro and now majority-owned by Block, Inc. Tidal is available in 61 countries and licenses 100 million tracks and 650,000 music videos.

A map indicating the countries in which Tidal is available, as of November 2025

Tidal has distribution agreements with major and independent record labels. Tidal claimed in 2015 to pay the highest percentage of royalties to music artists and songwriters within the music streaming market. However, later informal studies showed that some other streaming services pay a higher percentage than Tidal.

In March 2015, Aspiro was acquired by Project Panther Bidco Ltd., which relaunched the service with a mass-marketing campaign, promoting it as the first artist-owned streaming service. In January 2017, Sprint Corporation bought 33% of Tidal for a reported $200 million. In March 2021, Block, then known as Square, agreed to pay $297 million for majority ownership of Tidal. In June, 2022, through the disclosure of the annual stockholder meeting 2022, Block reported that the stake acquired in the Tidal music service was 86.8%.

While some observers praised the high-fidelity audio quality and higher subscription fees that would result in higher royalties to the artists and songwriters, others felt the high subscription fees and exclusive Tidal content from the artists involved could lead to more music piracy. Tidal claimed to have over 3 million subscribers in 2016, although the veracity of those claims and the company's reported streaming numbers have been questioned.

== History ==
Branching off from WiMP, which was launched in Norway in 2010 and later available in Sweden, Denmark, Germany, and Poland, Aspiro launched the Tidal brand in the UK, the US, and Canada on October 28, 2014. The launch was supported by Sonos and 15 other home audio manufacturers as integration partners. In January 2015, Tidal launched in five more European countries: Ireland, Finland, the Netherlands, Belgium and Luxembourg.

Aspiro was purchased by Project Panther Bidco Ltd. (controlled by American rapper and businessman Jay-Z) for SEK 466 million (USD 56.2 million) in January 2015. Before the acquisition of Aspiro, Jay-Z stated in an interview with Billboard that he was willing to partner with other streaming services to carry out his vision. "We talked to every single service and we explored all the options," he said, "But at the end of the day, we figured if we're going to shape this thing the way we see it, then we need to have independence. And that became a better proposition for us, not an easier one, mind you," he concluded.

On April 16, 2015, it came to public attention that Tidal was closing its original Aspiro offices in Stockholm, terminating the employment for all Swedish employees and the CEO, Andy Chen. The company refused to comment on closing the offices but confirmed that Andy Chen had been replaced as CEO by Peter Tonstad. In September 2015, Tidal began selling digital downloads and CDs. In December 2015, Tidal appointed Jeff Toig as CEO of the company. Toig left the company in March 2017. Richard Sanders was announced as CEO in August 2017.

In early January 2017, Tidal partnered with Mercedes-Benz's web portal app. American rapper Nicki Minaj starred in a commercial promoting the Mercedes partnership. Tidal also announced a partnership with British company Master Quality Authenticated (MQA) which they claimed delivered master-quality recordings at typically 96 kHz / 24-bit with the highest possible resolution to its HiFi subscribers. Tidal was then the only streaming company to offer MQA. The catalog available in MQA on Tidal comprised certain albums and singles from Universal Music Group, Warner Music Group, its affiliates and certain independent distributors, including AvidPlay service provided by Avid Technology. After November 2020, the largest part of the MQA catalog available on Tidal was that of Warner Music Group and its affiliates, which was made available as part of a new deal with MQA and Warner Music Group itself. In the past, Sony Music also offered certain albums and singles from their catalog in MQA on Tidal, but their quantity later declined; exceptions include Beyoncé's albums Lemonade and Homecoming: The Live Album, both released by Parkwood Entertainment and distributed by Columbia Records.

In late January 2017, US mobile carrier Sprint announced that they were buying a 33 percent stake in Tidal, and it was reported that Sprint would offer exclusive content to Sprint customers.

In June 2017, Tidal announced a series of podcasts to launch in the same year. American rappers Fat Joe and Joey Badass hosted Coca Vision and 47 Minutes respectively.

In July 2019, Tidal expanded their credits feature and launched interactive official music credits on the platform, allowing user to click on musicians and other contributors. These credits are supplied by the labels and artists direct to Tidal.

In 2020, Tidal launched its "My Rewind" feature, which is available on the 1st of December every year alongside a curated "Best of" series, which allows users to view a compilation of data about their activity on the platform over the preceding year and allows them to share this on social media in a similar vein to Spotify Wrapped.

In March 2021, it was announced that financial technology company Square, Inc. had reached an agreement to acquire majority ownership of Tidal. Square would pay $297 million in cash and stock for Tidal, and Jay-Z would have a board position. Jay-Z and other artists who owned stock in Tidal would remain stakeholders.

In November 2021, Tidal introduced a free tier for the first time, though exclusively for the United States. CD-quality HiFi audio was also introduced to all paid plans, while MQA-quality audio was kept exclusive for the new HiFi Plus plan.

Tidal's download store closed in October 2022.

Tidal laid off more than 10% of its staff in December 2023.

In April 2024, Tidal merged its two subscription plans to become one, simply named Tidal, which offered the same quality as the former HiFi Plus plan (FLAC HiRes 24-bit/192 kHz and MQA – 24-bit/352.8 kHz). However, a month later, Tidal removed the feature to listen in MQA.

On July 24, 2024, Tidal dropped support for the 360 Reality Audio format.

In March 2025, Jack Dorsey, the CEO of Block, Tidal's parent company, announced plans to lay off 930 Block employees. He stated that the reorganization was a step towards increasing the company's stock value.

In June 2026, Tidal announced a policy on AI-generated music, stating that it would continue to allow AI-generated tracks on the service but would label music identified as entirely AI-generated and make such tracks ineligible for royalties. The policy, scheduled to take effect on July 15, 2026, also said Tidal would not tolerate AI-generated music that impersonates artists, misuses a person’s name or likeness, deceives listeners, or is associated with fraudulent streaming or upload activity.

== Platform exclusivity ==
A selling point for Tidal as compared with other streaming services such as Spotify and Pandora Radio is the exclusive content available from the artists who co-own the company, as well as others. Exclusive content available on the relaunch of Tidal included Rihanna's single "Bitch Better Have My Money", The White Stripes debut television appearance, Daft Punk's Electroma (2006), and playlists personally curated by Jay-Z, Beyoncé, Arcade Fire, and Coldplay. In 2015, Tidal stated on its Twitter (now X) feed that "lots of exclusive content [is] on the way".

Jay-Z's catalogue was not available on Spotify but was almost entirely exclusive on Tidal until 2019, his 50th birthday.

=== Artist ownership ===
On March 30, 2015, a press conference was held at Skylight at Moynihan Station in New York City, to relaunch Tidal. The conference started with a brief introduction and explanation of Tidal. After introducing the sixteen artist co-owners of Tidal onstage, recording artist Alicia Keys spoke on behalf of the artists and for Tidal. She stated, "So we come together before you on this day, March 30th, 2015, with one voice in unity in the hopes that today will be another one of those moments in time, a moment that will forever change the course of music history." Keys also described the event as like a "graduation". At the end of the press conference, all artists onstage signed a declaration, which stated Tidal's mission. Tidal claimed to have gained 100,000 new subscribers following the press conference revealing the artists involved in the service.

During the press conference, Jay-Z, Beyoncé, Rihanna, Kanye West, Nicki Minaj, Daft Punk, Jack White, Madonna, Arcade Fire, Alicia Keys, Usher, Chris Martin, Calvin Harris, deadmau5, Jason Aldean and J. Cole were introduced to the stage as "the owners of TIDAL". Eric Harvey of Pitchfork stated of the artists who co-own the service, "These are the 1 percent of pop music in the world right now, these are artists who do not answer to record labels, do not answer to corporations."

In June 2015, Lil Wayne joined the service's roster as an artist co-owner, starting the partnership by exclusively releasing a track on the service called "Glory". On February 23, 2016, T.I. joined the service's roster as the latest co-owner, beginning the partnership by releasing "Money Talk", a single from his tenth album, Dime Trap, exclusively on the service; his album was also streamed live on Tidal from Greenbriar Mall in Atlanta.

On July 1, 2017, it was reported Kanye West had left Tidal as co-owner and shareholder, after a financial argument with its board of directors regarding compensation for his contributions to the company. West later demanded payment from Tidal of $3 million for his inclusion on marketing efforts, video production, and claiming the release of his 2016 album The Life of Pablo was the reason for Tidal's 1.5 million subscriber increase soon after the release. In response, Tidal stated West failed to deliver the videos he promised on his contract.

=== Releases ===
In April 2015, Tidal exclusives included Beyoncé releasing a video of her performing "Die With You", a never-before-heard original song, dedicated to her and Jay-Z's wedding anniversary, Madonna releasing a teaser of her upcoming music video for "Ghosttown", and Rihanna debuting her new song and music video "American Oxygen".

In May 2015, Nicki Minaj and Beyoncé released the official "Feeling Myself" music video exclusively on Tidal.

In January 2016, Tidal released Rihanna's Anti as a one-week exclusive stream. In February 2016, Tidal secured an exclusive initial release with Kanye West's The Life of Pablo. West went on to vow that the album would "never appear on any other services [than Tidal]", nor would it ever be for sale. On April 23, 2016, Beyoncé released her second visual album, Lemonade, for streaming exclusively on Tidal. On April 25, it was made available for purchase by track or album on Amazon Music and the iTunes store and on May 6, it arrived at physical retailers.

Jay-Z's 2017 album 4:44 debuted on Tidal. The next year, Jay-Z released a collaborative album with Beyoncé, Everything Is Love, via Tidal.

=== Livestreaming ===
Tidal regularly streams concerts live and on-demand, including the Made in America festival and TIDAL X Brooklyn. In 2018, Tidal live-streamed Hot 97's 25th annual Summer Jam. Also in 2018, Tidal partnered with Equal Justice Initiative to live-stream The Concert for Peace and Justice. The concert commemorated the opening of The National Memorial for Peace and Justice and The Legacy Museum, both in Montgomery, Alabama.

== Reception ==
Shortly after Tidal's launch and press conference, the mobile version of the service entered the top 20 of the U.S. iPhone apps chart. Following criticism for its "out-of-touch marketing campaign", two weeks later, the app had already fallen out of the top 700 rankings in the same list.

=== Praise ===
Glenn Peoples of Billboard wrote that Tidal was a good thing for the music industry. He stated that the U.S. streaming market needed a "kick in the butt" when looking at the growth rate of streaming from 2014 to 2015. Peoples also noted that more competition in the streaming market is a good thing as it could lead to a "greater diffusion of innovation". He concluded that a service like Tidal – which is promoted as paying a fair amount of royalties to both the artists and the songwriters – will lead to the industry as a whole sorting out its issues with streaming royalties.

=== Criticism ===
Writing for USA Today's website in 2015, Micah Peters released a list of "3 reasons why Jay-Z's new Tidal streaming service is stupid". The article focused on points that the high fidelity, the lossless audio quality model being promoted was "overestimat[ing] the average listener". Peters worried that most listeners do not have the required, advanced headphones to distinguish the difference between ordinary and High fidelity audio (Hi-Fi). The article also stated that the $20 price was not reasonable for the mass market.

In 2015, recording artist Lily Allen expressed her opinions on Tidal on her official Twitter (now X) account. She feared that the high price of Tidal, as well as the mass popularity of the artist co-owners, could result in crippling the music industry and increasing piracy. She stated, "I love Jay-Z so much, but Tidal is (so) expensive compared to other perfectly good streaming services, he's taken the biggest artists… Made them exclusive to Tidal (am I right in thinking this?), people are going to swarm back to pirate sites in droves".

Jay-Z responded to criticism with a freestyle during the Tidal X: Jaÿ-Z B-Sides concert. He compared Tidal with Apple and Nike and wrote that Tidal had been subjected to hypocritical criticism.

Kanye West's decision to initially release his album The Life of Pablo as a Tidal streaming exclusive led to criticism from fans, who felt that streaming exclusivity could promote piracy. The album was pirated over 500,000 times as of February 17, 2016. West later made the album available to stream on competing services. In July 2017, West terminated his contract with Tidal, claiming that the service owed him $3 million.

== Finances and royalties ==
In 2015, one artist stated that artist royalties per track from Aspiro/Tidal were then over three times those paid by Spotify, but that royalties may decrease to provide a sufficient return on investment. Jay-Z commented in an interview to Billboard that artists would be paid more by being streamed on Tidal than with Spotify, stating "Will artists make more money? Even if it means less profit for our bottom line? Absolutely." In the same interview, he also stressed the service was for people "lower down on the food chain".

On February 27, 2016, Yesh Music, LLC and John Emanuele from the band The American Dollar launched a $5 million class-action lawsuit that claimed Tidal had to compensate the band for any of the royalty payments accrued from the streaming of the band's 116 copyrighted songs. The suit also accused Tidal of using faulty numbers to payout artists while also having undercut these same individuals by 35%. A response from Tidal stated that they were indeed fully up to date on all royalties for the group and had removed said intellectual property from their servers.

== Controversies ==
In January 2017, Norwegian newspaper Dagens Næringsliv ('Today's Business') reported that it had received internal documents disclosing lower subscriber counts than had been publicly announced by Tidal and its owners, having only 350,000 users in September 2015 (contradicting a claim by Jay-Z that the service had a million users), and 850,000 subscribers by March 2016, rather than the 3 million claimed by the service (which may have been inflated by including users that were using a free trial).

In May 2018, Dagens Næringsliv published a report accusing Tidal of intentionally falsifying streaming numbers for Beyoncé's Lemonade and Kanye West's The Life of Pablo albums and consequently paying inflated royalties to the artists' record labels. The newspaper supported its report with a comprehensive study from Norwegian University of Science and Technology's Center for Cyber and Information Security in Gjøvik. Variety reported, the music service, which "has rarely shared its data publicly", being the exclusive streaming platform for both albums, "claimed that West's album had been streamed 250 million times in its first 10 days of release in February 2016, while claiming it had just 3 million subscribers – a claim that would have meant every subscriber played the album an average of eight times per day; and that Beyonce's album was streamed 306 million times in its first 15 days of release in April of 2016."

"Beyoncé's and Kanye West's listener numbers on Tidal have been manipulated to the tune of several hundred million false plays… which has generated massive royalty payouts at the expense of other artists." It bases this claim on data contained within a hard drive it obtained that "contains ‘billions of rows of [internal TIDAL data]: times and song titles, user IDs and country codes"

— Dagens Næringsliv (via Music Business Worldwide)

The company denied any wrongdoing. Following the allegations, Norwegian collection society TONO filed an official police complaint against Tidal. Danish music organization Koda has also announced that it would be conducting an independent audit of Tidal data.. In 2023, all charges in the case were dropped by the Norwegian police as there was no evidence of any wrongdoing.

=== MQA audio quality controversy ===
After expressing skepticism about Tidal and MQA claims that MQA sound quality is better than standard PCM encoding with statements like "MQA offers our members a more natural, believable, involving and immersive listening experience," GoldenSound, a YouTuber, conducted a series of tests in 2021. At first, he published non-music audio test signals on the platform which were rejected because the MQA encoder was unable to encode the file. He then circumvented the validation by hiding test signals added to music, such as white noise, an impulse response, a square wave, a 32-tone test signal, and the RMAA test sequence interspersed with self-produced music. He uploaded a 44.1 kHz version and an 88.2 kHz version, which exceeded the encoder parameters meant to allow MQA processing with no audible loss, distortions, or compression.

Compared to the original test file, the MQA-encoded versions uploaded to Tidal distorted many of the test signals. The 88.2 kHz version also introduced high-frequency noise to the entire file. In contrast, the same files uploaded to other streaming services had no loss added, showing that the MQA encoding had reduced the overall quality. GoldenSound concluded that MQA is not lossless and deviates from the original master, as well as from how artists intend their work to be heard.

The test files uploaded to Tidal were removed shortly after GoldenSound sent an e-mail to MQA questioning their legitimacy and their recommended methods for encoding to MQA, stating that there is no viable or easy method to test their claims about lossless-ness, even for indie artists. These tests by GoldenSound were criticized by independent reviewers for the use of test signals which violated the MQA encoder parameters that are met in music produced by record labels and other legitimate sources.

In February 2022, musician Neil Young removed his music from Tidal after it had been converted to MQA and labeled "Master". Young criticized the audio quality and the MQA business scheme: "TIDAL's master is a degradation of the original to make it fit in a box that collects royalties. That money ultimately is paid by listeners, I am not behind it. I am out of there. Gone. My masters are the original." Young's discography has since returned to the service.

In April 2023, British company MQA Ltd, the owner of the MQA licence, announced that it had entered administration (bankruptcy protection). Shortly after this, TIDAL's CEO Jesse Dorogusker stated that high-resolution FLAC streaming would be available either concurrently or as a replacement for MQA content. Tidal began replacing MQA content with hi-res FLACs and prioritizing FLAC streaming over MQA, and announced in June 2024 that they would discontinue support for MQA altogether the following month, July 2024.

== Model ==
=== Platforms ===
Tidal has apps available for Microsoft Windows, macOS, IOS, Tesla and Android compatible devices. Tidal is compatible with Apple TV, Roku, CarPlay, Android Auto, Android TV, and Amazon Fire TV.

=== Plans ===
| Name | Audio quality | Bit rate | Codec |
|---|---|---|---|
| Free (Discontinued) | AAC at 160 kbps | 160 kbps | AAC (all supported operating systems) |
| TIDAL | AAC at 320 kbps, CD quality, Hi-Res PCM, Dolby Atmos | up to 9216 kbps (Dolby Atmos), 1411 kbps (FLAC), 320 kbps (AAC), or down to 96 kbps | AAC (all supported operating systems), FLAC (Android/Windows/macOS/Web browser/desktop app), ALAC (iOS), Dolby Digital Plus (Apple TV/Android TV/Amazon Fire TV for songs available in Dolby Atmos), Dolby AC-4 (select Android phones for songs available in Dolby Atmos) |

=== DJ Extension ===
Tidal supports several platforms for DJing with streaming music. Supported DJ software platforms include Rekordbox, Serato, djay, and VirtualDJ. Streaming for some DJ hardware is also supported, including certain hardware from Denon (Prime 4, SC5000, and SC5000M) and AlphaTheta (OPUS-QUAD and OMNIS-DUO). In October 2023, Tidal disabled stem separation functionality for DJs. In April 2024, Tidal started charging extra for DJ integrations via an add-on subscription called "DJ Extension", which also re-enabled stem separation.

== See also ==
- Comparison of music streaming services
- List of Internet radio stations
- List of online music databases
