= Barry's (company) =

American fitness brand

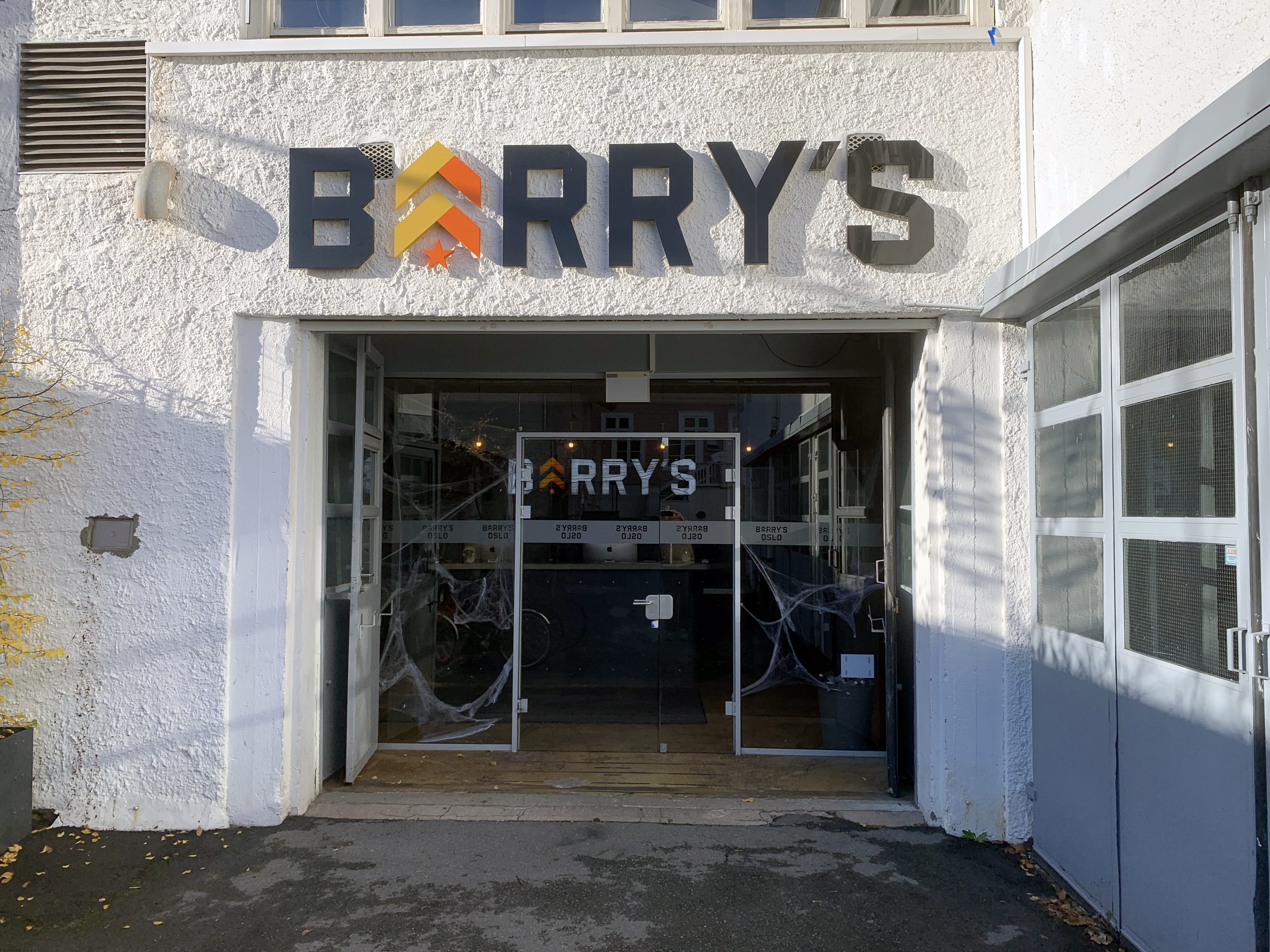
- A Barry's location in Oslo, Norway
- Formerly: Barry's Bootcamp
- Company type: Private
- Industry: Health club
- Founded: 1998; 28 years ago in Los Angeles, California, United States
- Founder: Barry Jay; John Mumford; Rachel Mumford
- Headquarters: Miami, United States
- Number of locations: 89 studios (2025)
- Revenue: US$100,000,000 (2023)
- Website: barrys.com

Barry's (formerly Barry's Bootcamp) is an American fitness studio chain from Los Angeles. It offers in-studio and digital class modalities, Fuel Bars, and retail offerings. Barry’s has 89 studios across 15 countries, with the majority in the United States.

== History ==
Barry's was co-founded in West Hollywood, Los Angeles in 1998 by Barry Jay, John Mumford and Rachel Mumford (née Coxton). The company opened its first studio outside of the United States in 2011, when it debuted in Bergen, Norway. That same year, Barry's opened its first studio in New York, and in 2013 the company opened its first studio in London.

Barry's CEO Joey Gonzalez began working at the company in 2003, working his way up from an instructor. He became CEO in 2015. In 2024, Jonathan (JJ) Gantt was named co-CEO to lead the company alongside Gonzalez. Gantt was previously the company's chief financial officer and later its president before being promoted to co-CEO.

Private equity firm North Castle Partners announced an investment in July 2015 in which they purchased the majority of the company.

Two years later, in 2017, Barry's began expanding further, opening studios in the American cities Chicago, Dallas, San Francisco, Boston, Atlanta and Washington, D.C., as well as in international cities Toronto, Calgary, Milan, Stockholm, Sydney, and Dubai. In 2019, the Red Room expanded across more cities around the US including Houston, Charlotte, and Philadelphia.

In February 2022, Barry's launched Barry's Ride x Lift, a lower impact 50-minute class that uses bikes rather than treadmills. Ride is currently offered in West Hollywood, California, and New York's Chelsea neighborhood. In August 2024, Barry's took Ride internationally to Frankfurt, Germany.

Barry's shortened its name from Barry's Bootcamp in 2019.

In January 2025, private equity firm Princeton Equity Group announced its position as Barry's next strategic investment partner.

Each year, Barry's has special fitness programming to celebrate Pride Month. Throughout June, Barry's clients who complete classes receive special rewards and Academy Stars.

== Services ==
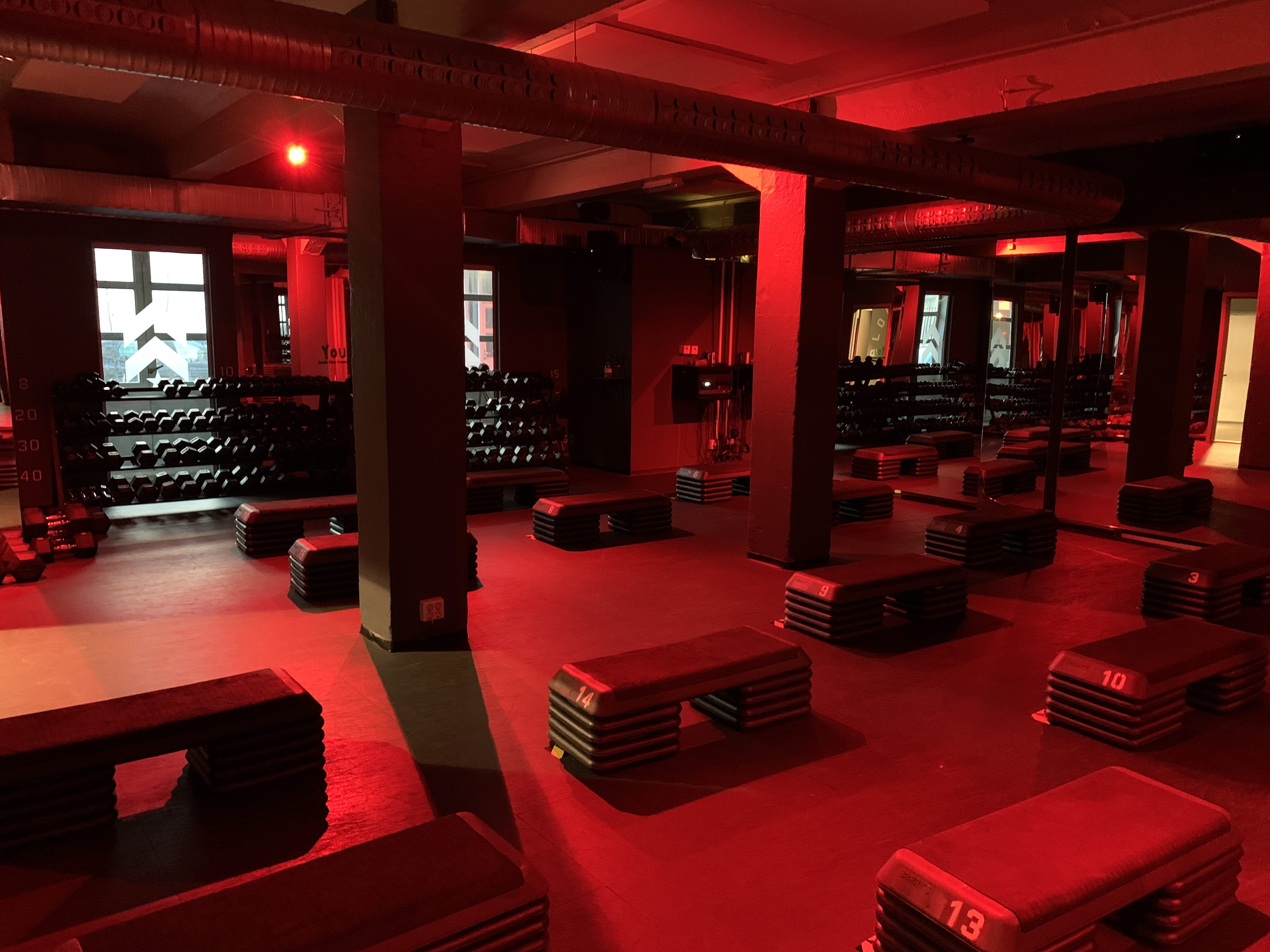
Barry's dimly red-lit studios are called the "Red Room".

RUN X LIFT classes are 50 minutes and consist of alternating intervals of running on the treadmill and lifting weights on the floor.

Barry's Lift is a dedicated strength training class designed to complement the work done in the original Red Room by building muscle mass and concentrating on form.

Barry's Ride x Lift is a 50-minute class offering high-intensity interval training style indoor cycling paired with traditional Barry's floor work.

Barry's studios are outfitted with a Red Room, a Fuel Bar for pre-and post-workout shakes, and locker rooms stocked with amenities like Dyson hair dryers and OUAI's best-selling products.

Barry's holds several frequency challenges per year, such as Find Your Strength, in which clients commit to taking either 10 or 20 classes in 30 days for rewards and redeemable stars in The Academy.

== Media coverage ==
Barry's was featured in the December 7, 2019 episode of Saturday Night Live. In the sketch, singer and actress Jennifer Lopez auditions to become a Barry’s instructor.
