= Aupeo =

Internet radio service

AUPEO!
- Key people: Directors: David J. Taylor, Dhiraj Cherian
- Launched: 2008
- Platforms: Web, iPhone, iPod Touch, iPad, Android, Symbian, Windows Phone, several hardware devices
- Pricing model: Subscription or ad-financed
- Availability: Worldwide
- Website: www.aupeo.com

Aupeo, stylised as AUPEO!, was a personalized internet radio service. Aupeo is a licensed webcaster in more than 40 countries worldwide. The company was formed in 2008 in Berlin as Aupeo GmbH and is financed by venture capital.

As of November 2011, the Aupeo archive encompassed around 900,000 tracks.

== Overview ==
The service offered over 120 pre-developed stations, covering a range of genres; these included Pop, Rock, Hip-Hop, R&B, Heavy Metal, Country, House, Techno, Classical, and Punk. Users were able to select stations that follow a theme, genre, or musical mood. In addition to these stations, users could also listen to ‘Artist Stations’, stations that play music related to an artist selected by the user. Aupeo’s ‘Mood Tuner’ allowed users to listen to stations specifically based on musical mood (happy, relaxing, aggressive, dramatic, stressful). AUPEO! was the first audio app to team up with Volkswagen cars using MirrorLink technology. It is also available in Audi vehicles.

On October 28, 2016, Aupeo announced that The AUPEO! Service would cease general public operations on November 30, 2016.

== History ==
In 2008, Aupeo established itself as a music streaming company and offered a personalized radio service called AUPEO! Personal Radio. Aupeo relied on its technology to enable listeners to develop a personalized radio stream either by selecting a genre of music, an existing station with a pre-defined theme, or by typing in the name of an artist. The AUPEO! Personal Radio recommendation system functioned by using an automated classification system that is subsequently verified by members of staff. In collaboration with the Fraunhofer Society, Aupeo developed an algorithm which allowed the service to quickly identify certain musical qualities, automatically assigning genre classification. These classifications were then reviewed and refined by Aupeo members of staff.

Over the years, Aupeo teamed up with several leading manufacturers from the Mobile, PC, Connected TV/STB and Home Entertainment industry such as Loewe, Philips, Asus, Acer, Nokia, Onkyo, TechniSat and Sonos.

Aupeo's technology rapidly attracted the interest of the automotive industry and thus, in 2010, the company brought the AUPEO! service into Mini vehicles Aupeo quickly expanded its platform availability to several car partners such as BMW, Mercedes-Benz, Honda, Toyota, Ford, Audi, Volkswagen and Jaguar and Land Rover. In April 2013, the company was acquired by Panasonic Corporation of America and attempted to pivot towards providing entertainment and infotainment services in vehicles under the leadership of Detroit-based British executive David Taylor.

== Personal Radio by AUPEO! ==
During CES 2015, Aupeo launched Personal Radio by AUPEO!, a then-new connected audio platform for the automotive industry. The service offered more than 350 curated stations from all genres and time periods. In addition to these stations, users could also listen to ‘Artist Stations’, stations that play music related to an artist selected by the user. Aupeo’s ‘Mood Tuner’ allowed users to listen to stations specifically based on musical mood (happy, relaxing, aggressive, dramatic, stressful). With Personal Radio by AUPEO!, consumers could also hear local and global news, sports, traffic and weather with their favorite music. The talk stations were available in the North American market and featured content from CBS Radio News, TheBlaze Radio News and TheBlaze Radio Network, AccuWeather, GEO Traffic and Umano. The service was available in more than 60 countries worldwide and five million vehicles globally, covering 20 brands from most major manufacturers.

== The Aupeo Business Model ==
Aupeo was a wholly owned subsidiary of Panasonic Corporation of North America. The service was funded by advertising, mainly in the form of audio advertising and banner advertisements. Alternatively, Aupeo also offered the possibility for users to subscribe to a ‘Premium’ service for 4.99 USD/EUR per month. ‘Premium’ user accounts had no advertising. In ‘Premium’ accounts, the audio quality was increased to 192 kbit/s and the limit of 'skips' (the ability for users to skip through songs that are being played) raised up to 10 times per hour and 50 times per day.

== Legal Status ==
Aupeo! was not an on-demand streaming service but fell under the international webcasting agreement created by the IFPI. In accordance with these requirements, Aupeo were able to provide its services in more than 60 countries.

Royalties were distributed to artists and labels through external performing rights organizations, including GEMA in Germany and the BMI in the United States.
