= Blinkbox Music =

Former music streaming service

- Website type: Streaming media
- Dissolved: November 2013; 13 years ago
- Owner: Guvera
- Revenue: Advertising, subscription
- Registration: Free, required for streaming, required to create playlists
- Launched: April 2007; 19 years ago (as We7); May 2013; 13 years ago (as Blinkbox Music)
- Current status: Defunct

Blinkbox Music (originally We7) was a free, advertising supported, music streaming service, with over 12 million tracks available for streaming in the UK and Ireland, with content from the music industry, and most independent labels and distributors.

It was founded by former Genesis frontman Peter Gabriel and tech entrepreneur Steve Purdham, who had previously co-founded and built his previous company SurfControl PLC. Senior management included Gareth Reakes, Russell Chadwick and music executive Clive Gardiner.

Songs streamed on Blinkbox Music were accompanied by a short audio advert, or blipvert, which plays before each song. This was usually combined with a change in the advert on the page, with the intent of the audio advert drawing attention to the clickable advert.

We7 reached 500,000 users and 3.5 million tracks in March 2009 and 3 million users and 6.8 million tracks in January 2011.

In June 2012, We7 was acquired by UK retailer Tesco for £10.8 million and was rebranded under the Blinkbox name in May 2013.

Tesco sold the service to Guvera in January 2015. Blinkbox Music was placed in administration in June 2015.

In October 2015, the former employees of Blinkbox Music filed a £10m class action lawsuit against Guvera.

== History ==
We7 logo until 2013

We7 originally launched as a music download service in June 2007, with 3 million tracks available to stream from launch.

In October 2008, the site shifted focus to music streaming, initially with content from Sony BMG, including a change of design that integrated a persistent music player in the page, allowing the music to continue to play while users browse the site.

Since the full launch in November 2008, the site has had various promotions and exclusives. In February 2009 it partnered with NME to provide streaming music widgets on their article pages, and in March it introduced an exclusive 'listening party' preview of Dutch singer Alain Clark's debut UK single "Father & Friend", followed by an exclusive version of his album the week after.

In February 2010, We7 embraced the freemium business model by offering an advert-free service for a monthly subscription.

At the end of September 2011, We7 changed from an on demand service to a music DJ service. This opened up a new premium service offer as well as a new logo and site layout. This stopped the free choice of songs that was previously the We7 service and opened a recommended music player instead which plays related songs and artists. Free users had a 50 limit of requests to add to the radio queue.

In March 2012, the company made a number of redundancies after the relaunched music DJ service led to a downturn in users and ad-revenue.

In May 2013, the company announced that it would be changing its name to Blinkbox Music, within weeks. The subscription service closed at the end of November 2013.

In 2015, Blinkbox music was in administration after being bought by the Australian company Guvera.

== Features ==
The main feature of the site was for streaming full tracks without requiring registration. However as of 2011, users have to register for free to listen to a song, otherwise just a 30-second preview is provided. Registration is also required for advanced features such as making playlists, and purchasing music. Due to technical problems, however, a small minority of visitors were getting full tracks for nothing.

The site also had an editorial section titled the 'Magazine', which featured interviews with artists and occasionally runs competitions, such as the Metro Station competition.

== Financial performance ==
On 6 October 2010, We7 posted losses of £3.6 million. The company claimed that market conditions, the collapse of the banking sector and the ongoing nervousness of the music industry caused the losses. The Guardian had reported earlier in 2010 that We7 had become profitable, using adverts to cover both running costs and payments to labels, which made it the first music streaming company to do so with UK operations.

== Mobile applications ==
On 18 February 2010, We7 launched its iPhone App. Only users with a "premium plus" account were able to use the application. There was some criticism of the app, because the premium plus account was not launched until 1 March 2010. Premium plus accounts are no longer necessary to use the app. The app has been rebranded and is now known as Blinkbox Music.

On 20 September 2010, We7 launched its Android app. Only users with a "premium plus" account are able to use the application, although there is a free 2 week trial when first using the service. We7 later added a new update/new app to the Android Market which can be used by free accounts to access the radio station part of We7, but it still offers caching and users can cache stations; the service was called We7 Radio Plus. The app has been rebranded and is now known as Blinkbox Music.
