= Grooveshark =

Defunct web-based music streaming service

- Website type: Music
- Owner: Escape Media Group Inc.
- Creators: Sam Tarantino; Josh Greenberg; Andrés Barreto
- Commercial: Yes (freemium)
- Registration: Optional
- Launched: March 30, 2006; 20 years ago Closed on April 30, 2015; 11 years ago
- Current status: Defunct

Grooveshark was a web-based music streaming service owned and operated by Escape Media Group in the United States. Users could upload digital audio files, which could then be streamed and organized in playlists. The Grooveshark website had a search engine, music streaming features, and a music recommendation system.

The company won a major lawsuit filed by Universal Music Group concerning use of Universal's pre-1972 recordings. Grooveshark was also sued for copyright violations by EMI Music Publishing, Sony Music Entertainment, and Warner Music Group. Concerns about copyrights led Apple and Facebook to remove Grooveshark's applications from the iOS App Store and Facebook Platform respectively. However, Grooveshark was available in alternative app stores, such as Cydia, Google Play and BlackBerry World. It was also a default application on Ubuntu Touch.

On April 30, 2015, Grooveshark abruptly shut down as part of a settlement between the service and Universal Music Group, Sony Music Entertainment, and Warner Music Group.

== History ==
=== Pre-release (2006–2009) ===
Grooveshark was a service of Escape Media Group Inc. (EMG), based in Gainesville, Florida, with additional offices located in New York City. It was founded in March 2006 by three undergraduates at the University of Florida: Andrés Barreto, Josh Greenberg and Sam Tarantino (who became CEO). During its first two years, Grooveshark functioned as a paid downloadable music service, with its content sourced from its proprietary peer-to-peer (P2P) network, which required users to install its "Sharkbyte" application. Grooveshark stated that it paid users who uploaded a transacted song a portion of the accounting costs for the song. Grooveshark positioned itself as a legal competitor to other popular P2P networks such as LimeWire, although questions about its legality arose from the beginning.

Grooveshark entered beta in September 2007. In the beta, users bought and sold tracks among themselves for 99 cents. Around 70 cents went to the record label, 25 cents to the user selling the track, and 4 cents to Grooveshark. Grooveshark's model had been approved by various small record labels, but not by any of the major record companies.

=== Flash web player (2008–2012) ===
On April 15, 2008, the service launched its web service, enabling users to click and play songs on the site without having to download an application. The new web service was a Flash media player called "Grooveshark Lite", and added a feature for autoplaying recommended songs. The service rose in popularity, with founders Greenberg and Tarantino named 2008 finalists for Bloomberg Businessweek's list of "America's Best Young Entrepreneurs".

As of 2009, Grooveshark had secured almost $1 million in seed funding. Also in 2009, Grooveshark launched its artist platform called Grooveshark Artists, which served as an analytics service for artists whose music was streamed on the site. On October 27, 2009, Grooveshark revised its interface, which featured skipping to any point in a song, left-hand navigation, customizable site themes, and drag-and-drop editing of playlists. On December 2, 2010, the site's interface was rewritten for HTML5. Another update occurred in October 2011.

On January 18, 2012, Grooveshark removed service in Germany, stating that it closed due to the costs of licensing. On November 21, 2011, Grooveshark was a Mashable Awards 2011 Finalist in the Best Music Service or App category. On December 19, 2011, Grooveshark co-founders Sam Tarantino and Josh Greenberg were listed among the Forbes 30 Under 30 in Music.

=== HTML5 web player (2012–2015) ===
On August 28, 2012, Google Play restored Grooveshark's app. On September 5, 2012, Grooveshark presented its full HTML5 player, effectively nullifying Google's and Apple's decisions to make the service unavailable to mobile apps. On November 12, 2013, executive Eddy Vasquez was murdered. In 2013, Cydia repositories iHackStore, BigBoss Repo, c0caine, and all others brought back the Grooveshark app for the iPhone with the ability to download songs and import them directly to the music app within the Grooveshark app. From July 2014, Grooveshark announced that it would accept Bitcoin as a form of payment via Stripe.

=== Shutdown (2015) ===
On April 30, 2015, it was announced that, as part of a settlement of the copyright infringement lawsuits between the service and Universal Music Group, Sony Music Entertainment, and Warner Music Group, Grooveshark would be shut down immediately. Furthermore, the ownership of the Grooveshark service, website, and all of its associated intellectual property would be transferred to the labels. The Grooveshark website was replaced with a message announcing the closure, and pointed users towards licensed music streaming services. The move came after it was disclosed that the company could have been liable for up to $736 million in damages if it were determined that the website's infringement of copyrights was willful.

Shortly after the shutdown, a new Grooveshark-branded website surfaced under a different top-level domain, offering a basic MP3 search engine that claimed to use the site's previous library of music, and promising to restore much of its original functionality. Although the site's anonymous creator claimed to have had a prior "connection" to the site and promised future development, it was later found that the "new" Grooveshark was simply a re-branded version of an existing MP3 search engine. After the labels were granted a temporary restraining order, the clone's domain name was seized, although the site quickly re-appeared on a new domain. Tools have been created for retrieving Grooveshark playlists, such as playlist.fish, Audiosplitter and StreamSquid.

On July 19, 2015, Grooveshark co-founder Josh Greenberg died in his home at the age of 28 of undetermined causes.

== Features ==
Grooveshark was a rich Internet application that originally ran in Adobe Flash. In December 2010, Grooveshark redesigned its site to provide an HTML5 interface. Grooveshark displayed songs, playlists, and users. Grooveshark had a Java Web Start application that scanned user folders for MP3s, uploading and adding them to the user's online library. The ID3 information of the uploaded song was linked to the user, and the file would be uploaded to Grooveshark, which then would offer on-demand music playback. All content on the service was user-sourced. In 2010 Time's on-line supplement had listed Grooveshark among its 50 Best Websites.

Grooveshark streamed over 1 billion sound files per month, contained over 15 million songs, and had 20 million users. Users could search and find music by song, artist, album, browsing friends' recent activity, and even through other users' playlists. The service allowed users to create and edit playlists. Registered users could save playlists to an account, subscribe to other users' playlists, and share them through e-mail, social media, StumbleUpon, Reddit, or an embeddable widget. Users could listen to radio stations of particular genres or populate their own station via their list of songs. The site would use the song list to stream similar music, and this stream selection would update using user ratings of songs. Grooveshark featured a "Community" section, where users could view the activity of friends by "following" them. Users could also connect other social media accounts.

Users could obtain basic accounts without fees. Grooveshark offered two subscription services that gave users increased features, no banner ads, and playability on mobile devices.

== Critical reception ==
In 2013, Entertainment Weekly compared a number of music services and granted Grooveshark a "B", rating, "Users upload libraries onto cloud servers, which means fewer catalog holes. But there's only an Android app, and the Web interface can get sluggish."

== Copyright issues ==
CEO Sam Tarantino stated that the company strictly follows the takedown procedures of the US's Online Copyright Infringement Liability Limitation Act, stating that usually Grooveshark expeditiously removes content. However, representatives of the music labels argued that songs that are taken down due to infringement claims often reappear almost immediately. Due to copyright concerns and pressure from record labels, many third party companies distanced themselves from Grooveshark. Apple pulled the Grooveshark app for iOS from App Store on August 16, 2010, shortly after its release in response to a complaint from Universal. On April 1, 2011, the Grooveshark application was pulled from the Android Market. In May 2012, Facebook removed Grooveshark "due to a copyright infringement complaint". At the end of April 2013 Google Search started censoring the term "grooveshark" from its autocomplete feature. In 2012, the British Phonographic Industry engaged Phonographic Performance Limited regarding Grooveshark's licensing, and as of November 2013, was attempting to have all United Kingdom ISPs block the website.

=== Universal Music Group ===
Robert Fripp claimed Grooveshark continued to distribute his music, after repeated takedown notices and other complaints. His exchange was included in Universal's suit, filed in November 2011, against Grooveshark.

Universal Music Group filed a copyright infringement lawsuit against Grooveshark on January 6, 2010, alleging that Grooveshark maintained on its servers illegal copies of Universal's pre-1972 catalog. In July 2012, New York State Supreme Court Judge Barbara Kapnick ruled that pre-1972 recordings were covered by the "safe harbor" provision of the Digital Millennium Copyright Act In April 2013, the New York State Supreme Court of Appeals reversed the decision, saying that pre-1972 licenses are not covered by the DMCA.

In November 2011, Universal Music Group brought an additional lawsuit against Grooveshark for more than $15 billion. UMG cited internal documents revealing that Grooveshark employees uploaded thousands of illegal copies of UMG-owned recordings. Six individuals were named as personally having uploaded between 1,000 and 40,000 songs each; other employees had uploaded 43,000 songs, according to page eight of the complaint. For each of the 113,777 alleged uploadings, a penalty of $150,000 was requested by Universal, amounting to an estimated $17.1 billion. Grooveshark denied all the complaints, complaining there was a "gross mischaracterisation" of the documents obtained during the lawsuit's discovery phase. In September 2014, the case was decided in favor of the record companies, with damages not yet determined.

Another major label, EMI, had also signed a license agreement for streaming music with Grooveshark in 2009 after settling a previous copyright lawsuit. However, on January 5, 2012, EMI sued Grooveshark over non-payment of royalties stating in their complaint that Grooveshark failed to provide "a single accounting statement". As a result, EMI dropped its licensing agreement with Grooveshark. Much of EMI is now owned by Universal Music Group.

=== Independent labels ===
Grooveshark had licensing deals with a number of independent record labels, such as Sun Records.

== See also ==
- List of social networking services
- List of Internet radio stations
- List of online music databases
- Streaming media
