= Guvera =

Former music streaming service

Guvera Ltd
- Website type: Music, Entertainment
- Available in: 4
- Headquarters: Gold Coast, Queensland, Australia
- Area served: Australia, USA, South Korea, Argentina, Chile, Colombia, Hong Kong, India, Indonesia, Malaysia, Mexico, Peru, Philippines, Russia, Saudi Arabia, Singapore, Thailand, Ukraine, UAE, Venezuela, Vietnam
- Founders: Claes Loberg, Brad Christiansen
- Industry: Music
- Website: www.guvera.com
- Registration: Required
- Users: 10,000,000+
- Launched: 2008; 18 years ago
- Current status: Inactive
- Native clients on: Windows Phone, Android, iOS

Guvera was a music technology company and former entertainment streaming service that focused on music technology development, access to global streaming rights, and a legacy music services business model. Guvera was founded in 2008 by Claes Loberg. After pausing operations in 2017, Guvera announced a relaunch in 2024 with new global partnerships and initiatives, though it quietly never materialized, with no new announcements after that year.

== History ==
Guvera was initially funded by AMMA Private Investment out of Australia. Guvera raised about $50m from its base of about 1000 smaller sophisticated investors primarily made up of accounting firms and other financial services businesses.

Guvera was incorporated in 2008, and launched beta in Australia February 2010, and in the US March 2010. Guvera was initially released as a beta to a select group of users by invitation only. Guvera had agreements with music labels in the regions where the product was available, which allowed for legal free music streams.

In August 2011, Guvera appointed Phil Quartararo as its Global Head of Music. In September 2011 the company moved into new headquarters in The Rocket in Robina, Gold Coast, Australia. In March 2012, Guvera created a mobile platform and in December 2012 released mobile apps for IOS and Android in Australia. An iPad app was then released in August 2013. In March 2014 an agreement was signed with Lenovo to become its worldwide music partner, with Guvera's music streaming service pre-installed onto Lenovo mobile devices.

In January 2015 Guvera acquired Blinkbox Music from Tesco. It placed the company into administration in June 2015, having exhausted Blinkbox's financial reserves. The company had bought Blinkbox Music as part of an agreement with Tesco that it would pay its employees a higher rate of redundancy payment if the business failed, which it did not honour. In 2015 the company received a Gold award at the Asia App Design Awards.

In October 2015 the former employees of Blinkbox Music filed a £10m Employment Tribunal case against Guvera. The Tribunal awarded them £3.5m in damages, which Guvera appealed. The Employment Appeal Tribunal dismissed the appeal on 22 November 2017.

In May 2016 Guvera won an international Gold at the Global App Design Awards.

In June 2016 Guvera was blocked from a stockmarket listing. The company began operating in only 5 markets: Australia, India, Indonesia, Saudi Arabia, and the United Arab Emirates, and Darren Herft stepped down as CEO in July 2016, replaced by founder Claes Loberg.

On 27 July 2016, the company shut down its operations in its home market of Australia and reiterated its intentions to "focus all efforts in key emerging countries, such as India and Indonesia". As of May 2017, Guvera shut down all operations across all remaining Asian markets.

On 27 June 2017 it was reported that a federal investigation in to Guvera had started.

In January 2018, former CEO Darren Herft was questioned in a public hearing by the Federal Court of Sydney about the company's operation and failure.

On August 9, 2024, Guvera announced a planned relaunch, as well as a new K-pop streaming partnership in South Korea, giving the company streaming rights to over 600,000 K-pop songs. This is similar to Guvera's previous international music streaming model. However, that now makes up only a part of their business model, which has become deliberately diversified since its relaunch, with additional focus on legacy music services like live events to follow. The company also bought the rights to SoundStage Live and also announced an interactive "fantasy game" called MyVML later that year.

In October 2024 a two-part documentary on Guvera was released by the Australian Special Broadcasting Service.

Since then, nothing new has been announced of the relaunch, with the company's last posts being in November 2024, and the company's current owner, Darren Herft, quietly moving to other projects. It is unknown if the company's relaunch has been quietly cancelled or delayed.

== Music streaming ==
Guvera streamed music and entertainment for its users and held licensing agreements with Universal Music Group, EMI, Orchard, INgrooves, IODA, Mushroom/Liberation, Shock Records, Believe Digital; in addition to the rights bodies APRA, AMCOS, BMI, RightsFlow, ACODEM, SESAC, Cash, EMMASACM, Extraphone, Peermusic, PRS/IMPEL, FILSCAP, First Music Publishing, Latinautor, MACP, Megaliner, National Music Publishing, SABAM, SADAIC, SBA, SACEM, SIAE, SOCAN, Sony-ATV, SGAE, Solar, Warner Chappell, Universal Music Publishing, and Unisys. Guvera distributed DRM-free MP3 downloads with bitrates of 256 and 320 kbit/s. Guvera was also a targeted advertising platform, which targeted ads at relevant music genres. Content could be streamed via brand channels from within Guvera's platform, and the advertisers had a role in the selecting music content.

Guvera was available on web browsers, iOS, Android and the Windows Phone.

== See also ==
- Streaming media
- Music technology
- List of online music databases
