= List of internet radio stations =

This is a list of internet radio stations, including traditional broadcast stations which stream programming over the internet as well as internet-only stations.

== General ==
- 104.1 Territory FM – Darwin, Northern Territory, Australia
- 3KND – Australia
- ABC NewsRadio – Australia
- AME Info – Business Features/Music
- Ananova
- Arutz Sheva – Israel National Radio
- Canadian Broadcasting Corporation/Television Radio Canada
- China Radio International
- CKUA Radio Network – Canada
- CityPulse 24 – Canada
- CTV – Canada
- Danmarks Radio – Denmark
- Deutsche Welle – Germany
- ERT – Greece
- FBi Radio – Sydney, Australia
- FOX FM (Melbourne), Australia
- France Télévisions – France
- Fresh FM – Adelaide, Australia
- Galgalatz – (Israeli music and entertainment network, operated by the Israel Defense Forces)
- HMWN – Canada
- Israel Broadcasting Authority
- Israel Defense Forces Radio
- Jerusalem Post Radio
- Radio Maria (USA)
- Life FM – Adelaide, Australia
- LRA Radio Nacional – Argentina
- Metropolitana FM – Brazil
- National Public Radio – United States
- Oui FM – France
- Radio Disney – United States
- RFI – France
  - Radio France – France
- Radio Nacional de España – Spain
- Radio Netherlands
- Radio New Zealand
- Radio Nova (France)
- Radio Popolare – Italy
- Radio Television Hong Kong
- Rai News 24 – Italy
- Radio RAI – Italy
- RTRFM – Perth, Australia
- SA FM – Adelaide, South Australia
- Saint FM Community Radio – Saint Helena
- Shonan Beach FM – Tokyo, Japan
- Slam!FM – Netherlands
- SomaFM – San Francisco, United States
- Star Ray TV – Canada
- Sveriges Radio – Sweden
- Triple J – Australia
- Voice of America
- Voice of Indonesia – Indonesia
- WMMT (FM) – United States
- WRocK Online – Philippines

=== BBC ===
- BBC Radio 1
- BBC Radio 2
- BBC Radio 3
- BBC Radio 4
- BBC Radio 5 Live
- BBC Radio 6 Music
- BBC Radio 1Xtra
- BBC Radio 4 Extra
- BBC Radio 5 Sports Extra
- BBC Asian Network
- BBC Local Radio – England and the Channel Islands
- BBC Radio Foyle – Northern Ireland
- BBC Radio Ulster – Northern Ireland
- BBC Radio Nan Gaidheal – Scottish Gaelic
- BBC Radio Scotland
- BBC Radio Cymru – Welsh
- BBC Radio Wales
- BBC World Service

=== Radio France ===
- FIP
- France Inter
- France Info
- France Culture
- Le Mouv'
- France Bleu
- France Musique

=== Radio Netherlands ===
- NPO Radio 1
- NPO Radio 2
- NPO 3FM
- NPO Klassiek
- NPO Radio 5
- NPO Soul & Jazz

=== Indian internet Radios ===
- Boxout.fm
- RadioJoyAlukkas.com
- Radio Quarantine Kolkata

=== Sarawakian internet Radios ===
- Radio Free Sarawak

=== Raidió Teilifís Éireann ===
- RTÉ Radio 1 (current affairs and speech based broadcasting)
- RTÉ 2fm (rock and pop music)
- RTÉ lyric fm (classical music plus jazz, world music and arts)
- RTÉ Raidió na Gaeltachta (the Irish language station targeted at the Gaeltacht, and the Irish language-speaking community of Ireland)
- RTÉ 2XM (youth-orientated music)
- RTÉ Chill (chillout/ambient music)
- RTÉ Choice (comedy, documentaries, vintage, factual programming, and international music)
- RTÉ Gold (classic hits music)
- RTÉjr and TRTÉ (children's music)
- RTÉ Pulse (dance music)

=== Rai – Radiotelevisione Italiana ===
- Rai Radio 1 (News/Talk)
- Rai Radio 2 (Adult contemporary music)
- Rai Radio 3 (Classical music)
- Rai Südtirol (radio station) (in German language)
- Rai Italia Radio (closed 2011) – international

=== Yle ===
- YleX
- Yle Radio Suomi
- Yle X3M
- Yle Vega

== Weather ==
- AccuWeather

== Current affairs ==
- C-SPAN

== Entertainment ==
=== Music ===
==== Terrestrial and satellite stations ====
- BBC (see section above)
- CBC Radio Three
- Gaydar Radio
- Radio Caroline
- Sirius Internet Radio, the internet radio product of Sirius Satellite Radio
- XM Radio Online, the internet radio product of XM Satellite Radio

==== Community/public/campus/college/university stations ====
- andHow.FM
- Blast 1386AM
- Blast Radio
- CHSR-FM
- CIUT-FM
- CJRU The Scope at Ryerson
- CJRT-FM
- CJSF-FM
- CJSR-FM
- Claremorris community radio
- Coast FM
- Fresh Air (Edinburgh)
- KBAQ
- KCMP
- KCRW
- KDVS
- KEXP
- KFAI
- KFJC
- KGNU
- KKJZ
- KNAU
- KNHC
- KJHK
- KSDT Radio
- KMST
- KOSC
- KTEQ-FM
- KTRU Rice Radio
- KTU radio Gaudeamus
- KTUH
- Kube Radio
- KUMM
- KUOM
- KUVO
- KVSC
- KVMR-FM
- KWUR
- KZSC
- LSRfm.com
- Smoke Radio
- Surge
- Subcity Radio
- WBUL (AM), now Bulls Media
- WCPE-FM
- WDSE-FM
- WEFT
- WERS
- WESU
- WETS-FM
- WFMU
- WFUV
- WGDR and sister WGDH
- WHPC
- WHRW
- WHUS
- WKCR-FM
- WKNC-FM
- WKSU
- WKDU
- WKUF-LP
- WMBI-FM
- WMHB
- WNYC
- WOMM-LP
- WORT
- WQXR-FM
- WREK
- WRHU
- WRPI
- WUSB
- WVYC
- WXPN
- WZBC

==== Religious stations ====
- Jewish Rock Radio
- KLOVE
- Latter-day Saints Channel
- Vatican Radio
- Vision Radio Network (Australia)

==== Tourist & park information stations ====
- CFPE-FM

==== Corporate-owned stations ====
- CFOX-FM
- KDFC
- KNBR-FM
- KPIG
- KXXR
- WBLK
- WKBF
- WMMQ
- WMEZ
- WSM (AM)
- WTAM
- WXBM
- Virgin Radio

===== Audacy-owned stations =====
- CSTV XXL
- KALV-FM
- KCBS
- KCBS-FM
- KDKA
- KEZK
- KFRC-FM
- KFRG
- KFWB
- KHTK
- KILT
- KILT-FM
- KIMN
- KINK
- KITS
- KJAQ
- KJKK
- KKHH
- KLLC
- KLTH
- KLUC
- KMLE
- KMNB
- KMOX
- KMVK
- KMXB
- KNCI
- KNX
- KNX-FM
- KOOL
- KPTR
- KQKS
- KRLD
- KRLD-FM
- KROQ-FM
- KRTH
- KSFM
- KSON
- KSPF
- KSWD
- KTWV
- KUFO
- KUPL
- KVIL
- KWLI
- KXFG
- KXJM
- KXKL
- KXL-FM
- KXNT
- KXTE
- KXVV
- KYKY
- KYMX
- KYRV
- KYW
- KYXY
- KZDG
- KZJK
- KZOK
- KZZO
- WAOK
- WBBM
- WBBM-FM
- WBCN
- WBGB
- WBMX
- WBZ
- WBZZ
- WCBS
- WCBS-FM
- WCCO
- WCFS-FM
- WDOK
- WDSY
- WDZH
- WFAN
- WFNZ
- WINS
- WINS-FM
- WJBR
- WJFK
- WJFK-FM
- WJMH
- WJZ
- WKQC
- WKRK-FM
- WKVZ
- WLIF
- WLLD
- WLZL
- WNCX
- WNEW-FM
- WNLV
- WOGL
- WOMC
- WPGC-FM
- WPHT
- WQAL
- WQSR
- WQYK-FM
- WRBQ-FM
- WRCH
- WSCR
- WSOC-FM
- WTEL
- WTIC
- WTIC-FM
- WUSN
- WVEE
- WWJ
- WWMX
- WXRT
- WXYT
- WXYT-FM
- WYCD
- WYSP
- WYUU
- WZGC
- WZLX

== Internet-only ==
- 8tracks.com
- AccuRadio
- Amazing Radio
- Amazon Music
- AOL Radio
- Apple Music
- Apple Music 1
- Bloodstock Radio
- BlowUpRadio
- Campus Radio Online
- ChristianRock.Net
- Dandelion Radio
- Dare FM (WLIR)
- Deezer
- DI.FM
- Double J
- DWXB-FM
- East Village Radio
- Forge Radio
- Fréquence3
- Google Play Music
- Goom Radio
- Groovera
- Hitz Radio
- Kichwa Hatari
- KNAC
- Kube Radio
- Last.fm
- Libre.fm
- Live365
- LiveXLive
- Lutheran Radio UK
- MeeMix
- Musicovery
- Mutiny Radio
- New Normal Music
- oWOW Radio
- Pandora Radio
- Playlist.com
- Pulse 87
- radioio
- Radionomy
- Radio23
- Radio Disney
- Radio Free Brooklyn
- Radio Garden
- Radio MAQAM
- Radio Neshat
- Radio Paradise
- Radio Regent
- RadioVeRVe
- Radioseven
- rara.com
- RauteMusik.FM
- Rhapsody
- The Scope (CJRU 1280)
- SHOUTcast
- SomaFM
- Spotify
- Stitcher Radio
- Subcity Radio
- TLV1
- Traxx Radio
- VirtualDJ Radio
- Yahoo! Music Radio
- WBRU
- Whole Wheat Radio
- WOXY.com
- WRJQ
- AKTINA FM
