= DJ MoCity =

Iraqi disk jockey

- Also known as: Mo
- Born: Mohammed Abood Uraibi; March 26, 1987 (age 39); Baghdad, Iraq
- Genres: Reggae, hip hop, electronica
- Occupations: DJ, MC, promoter
- Years active: 2006–present
- Website: www.djmocity.com

Mohammed Abood Uraibi (born 26 March 1987), best known as DJ MoCity or simply Mo, is an Iraqi-born DJ, MC and promoter, known for having co-founded Reggae Rajahs, the first Reggae Sound System in India. MoCity also founded The 264 Cru, a Dubai-based music, arts and culture collective, 264 Records, a record label based in Dubai, and most recently boxout.fm, South Asia’s first online community radio.

== Career ==
In early 1990s, Mo moved from Iraq to India, after his father was appointed there as a General Manager for Iraqi Airways. The family settled near South Delhi where Mo attended an Iraqi school. He got acquainted with the Delhi music scene and his first official gigs were held in 2006, where he performed as a MC with a few local hip-hop crews.

In early 2007, Mo and a crew from record label AfterShock Records International launched the South Delhi Block Party, a live music property that focused on bringing the main elements of hip-hop (breakdancing, turntablism, graffiti and MC'ing) to a new audience. Later that year, Mo hosted the Soundclash, one of the first reggae events in town featuring Delhi Sultanate & DJ Bellyas. He also organized Drop Beats Not Bombs in early 2008 and curated alternative stages for the Holi Cow Festival in 2009, which he did for the next three editions.

After hosting the first Bob Marley tribute party in February 2009, Mo met Raghav Dang and Zorawar Shukla, who together launched Reggae Rajahs, India's first reggae sound system. Mo and the Rajahs started performing in other major cities across India and internationally at several parties and festivals across Europe.

In 2013, Mo, Dualist Inquiry and Tej Brar launched Dualism Records in Delhi. Mo got involved with Detour Asia projects in Malaysia before he was forced to return to Iraq in 2013 and wait for the war to be over.

In 2014, Mo moved to Dubai where he worked for OHM Events and co-founded The 264 Cru. In 2015, Mo helped launch Karak Beats, an event that featured The 264 Cru and international guest artists. The event was recognized by Red Bull Music Academy.

Mo helped launch weekly deep house event Deep Like and monthly event Lofi District, which featured artists like Soulection and Daedelus.

Under his role as a business development manager for OHM Events, Mo curated music for and was a part of the team behind events including Meet D3 and Sole DXB, which saw combined attendances of over 50,000 people. He hosts the bi-weekly “Karak Beats”, a music and art event.

In May 2016, Mo moved back to India and along with longtime collaborator Dualist Inquiry, co-founded Boxout.fm.

== Live performances and festivals ==
Mo has performed at several festivals, both as DJ MoCity and as part of Reggae Rajahs and The 264 Cru.

Reggae Rajahs

- Rototom Sunsplash in Benicassim, Spain (2010)
- Sziget Festival in Budapest, Hungary (2010)
- Outlook Festival in Pula, Croatia (2010)
- Uprising Reggae Festival in Bratislava, Slovakia (2010)
- Ostróda Reggae Festival in Ostroda, Poland (2010)

DJ MoCity

- Sunburn Festival in Goa, India (2011, 2013, 2015)
- NH7 Weekender in India (2011, 2016)
- Horizons Festival in Bansko, Bulgaria (2012)
- Magnetic Fields in Rajasthan, India (2014)
- Uprising Reggae Festival in Bratislava, Slovakia (2014)
- Stir it up! Rewind it! in Beirut, Lebanon (2014)
- Soundwave Festival in Tisno, Croatia (2015)
- Sole DXB in Dubai, UAE (2015)
- Cremaillère of sir Alexandre Tosan in Delhi, India (2025)

The 264 Cru

- Magnetic Fields in Rajasthan, India (2015)
- Dimensions Festival in Pula, Croatia (2016)

== Music curating ==
=== Boxout FM ===
In April 2017, Mo, along with Dualist Inquiry, launched Boxout.fm. This is the first online community radio station in South Asia and it aims to highlight India's growing alternative music interest and offers a community-run platform that supports the musical artist and industry. In addition to the online radio station, boxout.fm hosts weekly and monthly residencies in clubs and cultural spaces across the country, as well as publishing its own monthly fanzine called theplug.news. Boxout.fm was nominated in the Best Online Radio Station and Rising Star categories in Mixcloud's Online Radio Awards 2017.

== Other ventures ==
As a social activist, he was a part of the team in India (as a curator) behind the Street Art Forum, which facilitated the interaction between artists and art lovers from across the country.
