= DI.FM =

Internet radio broadcaster

- Type: Private
- Industry: Internet radio
- Founded: 1999
- Headquarters: Denver, Colorado
- Key people: Ari Shohat (CEO)
- Website: www.di.fm

DI.FM (formerly known as Digitally Imported) is an Internet radio broadcaster consisting of over 90 channels dedicated to electronic music, such as house, trance, techno, drum and bass, and dubstep. DI.FM broadcasts handpicked selections consisting of classic, new and up-and-coming hits, as well as weekly and monthly mixed shows from professional DJs. It was founded in December 1999 as a hobby project by Ari Shohat in his Binghamton University dorm room and was one of the first Internet radio stations. It has often been listed as one of the top internet radio stations.

During the 2000s, DI.FM participated in a number of protests against high royalty fees for Internet radio. In July 2009, Digitally Imported, radioIO and AccuRadio reached a revenue-sharing deal with royalty collector SoundExchange securing music rights. It also licenses out its own proprietary streaming platform to power other internet radio sites such as RadioTunes (formerly sky.fm), JazzRadio, RockRadio, ClassicalRadio and ZenRadio. DI.FM ended its free options in December 2024, becoming a subscription-only service.

== Channels ==
- 00s club hits
- Ambient (Note: Also airs on other associated networks)
- Atmospheric breaks
- Bass & jackin' house
- Bassline
- Big beat
- Big room house
- Breaks
- ChillHop
- Chillout
- Chillout dreams
- Chillstep
- Chill & tropical house
- Classic eurodance
- Classic eurodisco
- Classic trance
- Classic vocal trance
- Club dubstep
- Club sounds
- Dark DnB
- Dark psytrance
- Deep house
- Deep nu-disco
- Deep tech
- Detroit house & techno
- Disco house
- DJ mixes
- Downtempo lounge
- Drum and bass
- Drumstep
- Dub
- Dubstep
- Dub techno
- EDM festival
- EDM hits
- Electro house
- Electronic pioneers
- Electropop
- Electro swing
- Epic trance
- Eurodance
- Funky house
- Future bass
- Future garage
- Future synthpop
- Gabber
- Glitch hop
- Goa-psy trance
- Hands up
- Hardcore
- Hard dance
- Hardstyle
- Hard techno
- House
- Indie beats
- Indie dance
- Jungle
- Jazz house
- Latin house
- Liquid DnB
- Liquid dubstep
- Liquid trap
- Lo-fi hip hop
- Lounge
- Melodic progressive
- Minimal
- Nightcore
- Nu disco
- Oldschool acid
- Oldschool house
- Oldschool rave
- Oldschool techno & trance
- Progressive
- Progressive psy
- Psybient
- Psychill
- Psydub
- Russian club hits
- Soulful house
- Space dreams
- Synthwave
- Tech house
- Techno
- Trance
- Trap
- Tribal house
- UMF radio
- Underground techno
- Vocal chillout
- Vocal house
- Vocal lounge
- Vocal trance

== See also ==
- List of internet radio stations
