= Laurie Handlers =

Laurie Handlers (born November 27, 1947) is a Neotantra educator, talk show host, and intimacy coach. She is author of the book Sex & Happiness: The Tantric Laws of Intimacy and holds workshops and seminars through her organization Butterfly Workshops, Inc. as well as through the International School of Temple Arts (ISTA).

Handlers has a master's degree in education and a bachelor's degree in psychology and sociology.

Handlers has a radio talk show Sex and Happiness on BBS Radio as well as on WebTalkRadio.

Handlers has acted in several films, including Tantric Tourists. Her film Beyond Dinner was awarded "Best Short film" at the Erotikos Film Festival in Jamaica in September 2013.

== Controversy ==
Handlers' involvement with the International School of Temple Arts (ISTA)—an organization that has faced allegations of sexual misconduct and coercive practices—has been discussed in media reports and public statements about ISTA.

ISTA's U.S. nonprofit filings have listed Handlers as a vice president (2018 and 2019) and later as a director.

In a 2025 investigation published by New York (The Cut), journalist Anya Kamenetz reported that, after a former participant (identified as "Lina") said she had been raped during an ISTA Level 2 ritual in Turkey, Handlers replied to Lina's email to the organization and invited her to speak with Handlers and a representative from a third-party mediation service. The same report stated that ISTA later offered to refund Lina's Level 2 tuition on the condition that she sign a non-disparagement clause and an agreement releasing the organization from further liability; Lina did not sign, and ISTA disputed Lina's characterization of the incident as rape.

In the documentary film Tantric Tourists, Handlers is shown discussing participant exhaustion as a way of lowering defenses, calling being tired "a key element" in "weakening their defenses". In 2023, the Israeli Center for Cult Victims issued a public statement about ISTA that, among other concerns, described reports of sleep deprivation in ISTA workshops.
