= Voxound =

- Available in: English, Spanish
- Owner: Voxolutions SpA.
- Creators: Ignacio Baixas, Jaime Bunzli, Cristián Diaz, Juan Ignacio Donoso, Agustin Feuerhake
- Commercial: yes
- Registration: Optional (Facebook)
- Launched: 2008
- Current status: Inactive

Voxound is a music web site that offers streaming through YouTube videos and plays local files through the use of a downloadable daemon. Voxound strives to generate a general classification of music (also known as a folksonomy of music) and encourages exploratory search.

== History ==
The project was originally started by Jaime Bunzli as an attempt of solving his own needs for fixing and ordering his music collection. In 2007 he involved some of his colleagues at Pontificia Universidad Católica de Chile and started working in an initial Voxound prototype. In October 2008 the team got funding from family and friends and started from scratch. During the year 2009, Voxound developed a player for Windows, but its development was discontinued in early 2010. In October 2009, the Latin American Intel Challenge awarded them with $15.000 and tickets to participate in the Intel + UC Berkeley Technology Entrepreneurship Challenge.

As of 2010, the web application seems to be still under construction. As of 2013, the website is no longer accessible.

== Features ==
The Voxound website features faceted search, which allows a user to refine search adding or excluding tags from the result set. It also features a downloadable daemon which runs on Mac OS-X and Windows (there doesn’t seem to be a Linux version planned as of July 2010). The web application communicates with the daemon to find the metadata of the user's songs and plays local files through a flash plugin. The site relies on the Facebook Platform as its authentication system, allowing a user to explore his/her Facebook-friend's playlists and share music discoveries with them.

== See also ==
Similar websites

- Songza
- Slacker Radio
- Last.fm
- Jamendo
- MeeMix
- Deezer

Related concepts

- Faceted search
- Daemon
