= Boxout.fm =

boxout.fm
- New Delhi; India

Programming
- Language: English
- Format: Internet radio

History
- First air date: 7 April 2017

Links
- Webcast: Listen Live
- Website: boxout.fm

Boxout.fm is an online, community radio station based in New Delhi, India. It was founded in April 2017 by Mohammed Abood (DJ MoCity) and indie musician Sahej Bakshi (Dualist Inquiry). It broadcasts live from Gulmohar Park in New Delhi seven days a week with programming beginning each morning at 09:00 IST (UTC+05:30) and ending at 01:00 IST. Boxout.fm's shows are then archived for streaming free of charge to a global audience on Mixcloud.

According to its founders, the radio station was born of a need for a community-run music platform focused on showcasing alternative music and culture in India.

These radio programs are hosted by a collective of thirty resident DJs in addition to a large and growing number of broadcasts from guest DJs and cultural figures from India and around the world. The radio also welcomes submissions from artists looking to contribute musically to the station's programs.

== See also ==
- List of Internet radio stations
