= KSDT =

KSDT may refer to:

- KSDT Radio, an online radio station of the University of California San Diego
- KWQQ, a radio station (1320 AM) licensed to serve Hemet, California, United States, which held the call sign KSDT from 1994 to 2023
