= Diamond Dave (disambiguation) =

Diamond Dave (David Lee Roth, born 1954) is an American rock singer.

Diamond Dave may also refer to:

- Diamond Dave (album), his self-titled album released in 2003
- "Diamond Dave" (song), by the Bird and the Bee from the album Ray Guns Are Not Just the Future
- Diamond Dave Whitaker (1937–2026), American poet, author, and radio host

== See also ==
- Dave Diamond (1936–2014), American radio disc jockey
