= 8tracks.com =

Defunct Internet radio and social networking website

- Website type: Internet Radio, Music Oriented Social, Network
- Headquarters: Toronto, Ontario, Canada
- Owner: BackBeat Inc. (previously 8tracks)
- Creators: David Porter, Remi Gabillet
- Website: 8tracks.com
- Commercial: Yes
- Launched: 8 August 2008; 18 years ago
- Current status: Inactive

8tracks.com was an internet radio and social networking website revolving around the concept of streaming user-curated playlists consisting of at least 8 tracks. Users created free accounts and could browse the site and listen to other user-created mixes, as well as create their own mixes. The site also had a subscription-based service, 8tracks Plus - though this was only available to listeners based in the United States and Canada.

8tracks was recognized on Time magazine's 2011 edition of its "50 Best Websites" List. 8tracks also received positive press in Wired, CNET, and Business Insider.

Citing difficulties with funding and maintaining royalty payments, 8tracks ceased its services on 31 December 2019. However, on 19 April 2020, 8tracks was relaunched under the new ownership and operation of BackBeat Inc. As of December 2024, the service is inactive.

== History ==
One of Porter's significant influences for the project was Napster, more specifically its "Hotlist" feature, which allowed users to add other users to their "hot list", consequently giving them access to that user's entire library. Also, after having spent three years before business school in London, Porter was fascinated by the social nature of the city's electronic music scene, in which DJs gained cult-like followings and augmented their following primarily through peer referral. Based on these concepts, Porter drafted a business plan entitled "Sampled & Sorted", now the name of his blog, and garnered some initial attention for the project from venture capital firms. However, given his relative inexperience in the business world, Porter joined Live365, gained an understanding of their business model, their strengths and weaknesses and was able to refine his original proposition. With the rise of Web 2.0, Porter finally decided to found 8tracks in Fall 2006, and after compiling a preliminary team, was able to launch the site on August 8, 2008.

In November 2011, 8tracks made its debut in the Android Market, launching with more than 300,000 mixes. An Android 2.1 or higher device is required to use the app, but Market stats reveal over 10,000 downloads within days of release.

Between 2011 and 2015, there was also a list of tracks from SoundCloud provided by 8tracks for DJs to add to their mix.

In April 2013, 8tracks made its debut in the Windows 8 App Store. Any Windows 8 Pro or RT device, including desktop PCs and tablets was able to access the app.

In early 2016, 8tracks was required to stop offering streaming music via its app outside of the United States and Canada and instead started to use YouTube videos.

While initially, 8tracks did not feature commercial interruption during playlists, they adopted them in 2018, to remove their listening cap. Users were able to bypass these ads by buying a subscription service, 8tracks plus. The cost was $25 for a six-month subscription.

On 26 December 2019, 8tracks announced in a blog post that they intended to cease operations at the end of the year due to a lack of revenue and a lack of interest in their purchase by any larger company. By this time, there were less than 1 million monthly users, down from over 8 million in 2014. However, on 19 April 2020, 8tracks relaunched under the new ownership and operation of BackBeat Inc.

As of December 2024, the service is inactive. The service was last accessible on December 30, 2024.

== Website and app usage ==
Listeners were able to search through existing playlists of songs as well as create their playlists. The songs in the playlist were revealed one at a time, and listeners could skip three songs per playlist before they could "skip" onto a different mix, where their three skips were restored. Individual songs within a playlist each featured a direct link to iTunes should the user wish to purchase that song. Users were able to "like" entire mixes or "star" individual tracks within them to facilitate quick access in the future and could also "follow" other users, effectively subscribing to the mixes they created. Users also could embed the mixes they created and share them through social networking sites such as Facebook, Twitter, and Tumblr. 8tracks also could reverse sync with these social networking sites to allow users to easily find their "friends" and expand their network.

Anyone could upload a playlist to become a "DJ" on 8tracks. Mixes needed to include at least eight songs, uploaded from the user's music library or directly accessed from the 8tracks library. When creating a playlist, the site also requires users to add titles, images, descriptions, and at least two tags. When a DJ uploaded songs to the site, they appeared in a list next to where the mix is created. Users searched for mixes by individual artist, specific genre, or by utilizing the "cloud" feature that sorts mixes by tags (i.e., "autumn", "love", "sad", "eclectic"). DJs also had the option to mark mixes as unlisted, which made them private or unsafe for work (NSFW), which hid them from users who opted into a filter.

8tracks had an official Android, iPhone, Windows 8.x, Xbox 360, Mac app, and several unofficial third-party apps.

The Mix Feed gave users a stream of all their favorite tracks, allowed them to search for any artist of interest, or find mixes that include them.

8tracks' development stack was built using Ruby on Rails running on Amazon AWS. For datastores, MySQL (on Amazon RDS) was used. Other database systems used include: Redis, Solr, MongoDB, and Graphite. 8tracks also allowed other developers to use it, and hosted a forum to allow them to ask questions to staff.

By requesting for a unique artist tag, Artists were able to promote their music on 8tracks with a special account. They could create mixes with a combination of their own and others' music or full post albums via a content-owner account. By using 8tracks to promote their music, fans could interact with artists. Notable artists who used 8tracks to promote their music include: Metric, Bassnectar, Carolina Liar, and B.o.B.

== Partnerships and corporate connections ==
8tracks attempted to reach profitability by partnering with brands looking to open channels of communication with potential consumers through "music-centric interactive marketing" campaigns. For instance, the apparel store/community Threadless partnered with 8tracks to host a monthly contest in which Threadless' warehouse crew judges playlists, and the curator of their favorite mix wins a $50 gift certificate. To promote their new, retro Piiq headphones, Sony ran a contest in conjunction with fashion website Lookbook where users created mixes representative of "A Day in the Life (of You)" and those with the most likes won fashion and music-related prizes. Rolling Stone also added an interactive element to the release of its yearly "Playlist Issue" by compiling genre-specific celebrity- and artist-curated playlists that were hosted through the magazine's 8tracks user page and also embedded on the Rolling Stone website. This integrated media approach significantly allowed otherwise heavily copyrighted music to be streamed legally. Notable curators included Tom Petty, Elton John, Art Garfunkel, Coldplay's Chris Martin, and Metallica's Lars Ulrich. Finally, California hotel chain Joie de Vivre and its partners offered a variety of prizes to DJs who published and generated the most likes on mixes driven by the theme of "California road trip" in order to drive brand awareness during the peak summer travel season.

8tracks partnered with Feature.fm to offer artists the ability to play their songs as "sponsored tracks" to people listening to playlists of the artist's style of music.

8tracks paid royalties to SoundExchange, and ultimately their push for back royalties led to the closure in 2019.

== See also ==
- Comparison of on-demand streaming music services
- Comparison of digital music stores
- Comparison of music streaming services
- Comparison of online music lockers
- List of music software
- List of Internet radio stations
- List of online music databases
