= KPCR =

KPCR may refer to:

- KPCR-AM, a low-power radio station at Pomona College that operated from 1951 to 1955
- KPCR-LP, a low-power radio station (92.9 FM) licensed to serve Los Gatos, California, United States
- KPCR (FM), a defunct radio station (99.3 FM) formerly licensed to serve Fowler, Colorado, United States
- Real-time polymerase chain reaction
