= ITR =

ITR may refer to

- Income tax return (India)
- Indiana Toll Road
- Instrumental temperature record
- International Tax Review (ITR)
- Internet talk radio
- Inverted terminal repeat (molecular biology)
- i-Tree Tools software suite from the .itr file extension
- Ittar, a type of perfume
