= Radiobeta =

Internet radio portal

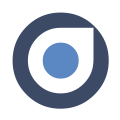
- Website type: Internet radio
- Available in: English, Spanish
- Owners: Radiobeta, Inc.
- Commercial: Yes
- Registration: Optional, free

Radiobeta.com is an Internet radio portal that allows users to create a personalized online radio experience. Listeners may find, listen, save and follow any station in the world that streams through this web. Users may also view, save and follow their shows and events. They can also view their comments, and comment or chat with other listeners while listening to the radio. The service can be accessed through the web, desktop apps or mobile devices. Radiobeta has an app for Webmaster, which they can customize and monetize.

== Basic functions ==
Radiobeta offers multiple ways for users to engage with its content. Besides being able to search through name, location, genre and language, users may view in real time the stations, shows and events, comments which they post on X (formerly known as Twitter), Facebook or on the Radiobeta portal. Listeners can chat with other listeners while they listen to the same station. Users may also suggest missing stations, shows or radio events, or edit the current one.

Users may register for free. Registered users will have a desktop where they can save, follow and manage their stations, shows, events, and other listeners.

== Radiobeta apps ==
Webmasters may add the Radiobeta app to their site to allow their listeners to access radio stations from around the world. The Radiobeta App may be customized with the Webmaster's logo, ads, X or Facebook accounts, RSS feed, or any external app embedded with the proper HTML code.

There is also a Radiobeta app for Facebook.

== Similar services ==
- Deezer
- iLike
- imeem
- Last.fm
- MeeMix
- MOG
- Pandora
- play.it
- Radiolicious
- Seeqpod
- Spotify

== Recent articles ==
- Le téléchargement peut être légal et gratuit (in French) Le Figaro April 22, 2009
- Un mundo de radios en la computadora (in Spanish) La Nación May 15, 2009
- Todas las radios en un solo sitio (in Spanish) Clarín May 28, 2009
- Your Guide To Music On The Web - Part #1 (in English) TechCrunch August 22, 2009
