= Mutiny Radio =

- San Francisco, California; United States

Programming
- Format: Eclectic

History
- First air date: June 1, 2011

Technical information
- Transmitter coordinates: 37°45′26.46″N 122°24′37.65″W

Links
- Website: mutinyradio.fm

Mutiny Radio is an internet radio station operating from the Mission District of San Francisco, California. The station has an eclectic talk format, hosting local shows with interviews, as well as live performances of comedy, music, hip-hop, theater, storytelling, philosophy, and poetry. Shows are streamed live online and made available in podcast form on ITunes and other platforms.

Mutiny radio reports on progressive, alternative, independent news through their website. Their in-station gallery is available to local visual artists showcasing their work.

== History ==
=== The legacy of pirate radio ===
Mutiny Radio was founded following an ownership dispute of the station's predecessor, pirate radio station Pirate Cat Radio, in which DJs questioned the leadership and finances of the station, the previous station's live stream and podcast archives were taken offline and the staff decided to reform as a collective with more oversight and accountability. According to a March 2011 statement by the collective's members, "Our efforts from the beginning have been to extract ourselves from the ownership situation and focus on our core mission: making quality radio and building a supportive community. That is what we are focusing on now." They stated their plan is to work "more democratically." This reformation initially consisted of putting podcasts up on the website Ustream to maintain radio operations and keep the community intact. DJs continued to work from the former cafe. The full relaunch was ready by the end of May, with programming director Aaron Lazenby stating that they were "tired of living in the wake of that drama" and adding that "we're ready to be something else." There was a closing ceremony on May 31, 2011, hosted by DJ Nylon.

=== Relaunch as an internet-based station ===
On June 1, 2011, the station was relaunched as Mutiny Radio, a name chosen to reflect "the right balance of where we've come from and where we’re going," according to Lazenby, which "showed the scars" of the past, but also expressed their new future. According to the website, the Mutiny Radio live stream "features the same eclectic mix of live music, interviews, DJ performances, news, and comedy the members of the collective have been producing for the past 6 years."

Unlike its predecessor's illegal broadcast, Mutiny Radio is an online-only radio station. In 2012, the station successfully raised over $5,000 through a Kickstarter campaign to be used for rent and other expenses to keep the station operating.

=== Local participation and event coverage ===
Past coverage of local events has included Occupy Wall Street West protests, live screenings of the 2012 Presidential Debates in affinity with Occupy the Debates, participation in the Phono del Sol Music and Food Festival, and an annual block party in cooperation with the Box Factory and other local businesses. Monthly broadcast events were coordinated with local bar Asiento and Oakland Art Murmur. Mutiny Radio also took part in San Francisco Mayor Ed Lee's honoring of the 50th anniversary of Tony Bennett's recording "I Left My Heart in San Francisco" with other stations across the city.

=== Musical guests ===
Guests have ranged from musicians such as George Clinton, Jane Wiedlin, Mary Wilson, Micky Dolenz, Belinda Carlisle, Toots and the Maytals, Roky Erickson and punk rocker Meri St. Mary to a variety of local bands. The band Monkey appeared on the show Afternoon Delight in 2017.

== San Francisco Comedy ==
After starting at the station in 2008, in June 2013, comedian, poet, and feminist activist Pamela Benjamin became station director. Since 2016, the station has hosted an annual Comedy festival which airs 25 comedy shows in five days. In 2017, there were approximately 100,000 downloads of podcasts per month.

Many local and famous City, North Bay, and East Bay comedians have hosted or participated in Mutiny Radio shows. Mutiny Radio produced four comedy open mics and two showcases every week in 2017, and it has continued to offer a variety of comedic programming. Notable contributors include Aaron Atkins, Warhol Kaufman, Rachel Pinson, Ernest Evangelista, Nathan Loe, Mike Evans Jr., Luke Neumann, Mark Noyer, the cast of Sylvan Productions (Vice channel's "Flophouse"), Terry Dorsey (Cobb's Comedy Club), Matthew Quirk, Evelyn "Eerie" Diamond, Bernice Ye, Sunny Dennis, Marty Cunnie (F-Bomb Comedy Train), Chris Ferdinandson and Mike Nordstrom (Like An Adult Podcast), Kala Keller, Alyssa Westerlund (StorySlam Oakland), Steve Poggi, Timothy Renato-Piaza (Fourteen Threes, ToggleDownfall), Kelly Evans, and David Stolowitz (KSCO 107.9 FM Santa Cruz).

The 2019 Comedy Festival was covered in the San Francisco Examiner.

Director Pam Benjamin has produced outdoor/parklet comedy shows for various venues in the Mission District since the start of the COVID-19 pandemic in May 2020.

== Awards ==
Merry Toppins and Vaperonica Dee's weekly podcast Cannabis Cuts won "Best Smoke on the Air" from San Francisco Bay Guardian's Best of the Bay 2012. DJ Tweaka Turner and The House of Pride Show(WED's 6-8PM) were nominated 5 times for a BESTIE AWARD by The Bay Area Reporter 2016-2019.

Mutiny Radio hosted local activist and poet "Diamond Dave" Whitaker on the Friday afternoon Common Thread Collective, who was honored in 2016 by the San Francisco Board of Supervisors. February 2 is officially Diamond Dave Day in San Francisco.

== Current shows ==
- Mike Spiegelman and Carl Haupt's Let's Watch a Full Length Movie on YouTube Sundays 2-4 pm
- Joke Workshop with Pam Benjamin and the San Francisco Comedy Community Mondays 6-8 pm.
- Uneek Radio with Queen Uneek and Calikoo Mondays 8-10 pm
- AllWays Free with Rachel Pinson Tuesdays
- Sean Martin's Bughouse Square Folk Tuesdays 6-8 pm
- Pam Benjamin's AltaCast Poetry on Wednesdays 12-2 pm
- Some Call Me Tim, Religion and Spirituality Discussion with Pam Benjamin Wednesdays 2-4 pm
- Michael Cerchiai's House of Pride, LGBT and House music Wednesdays 6-8 pm
- Racer's Alley Thursdays with Alex Torres
- Roman Rimer's "Weekly Review" News program Fridays 12-2 pm
- Bill Morgan's Labor and Love, Union News, Gospel and Jazz Music, and Labor History Saturdays 10am-12pm
- Scott Walker's "Flat Black Plastic"—classic vinyl albums Saturdays

== See also ==
- Community radio
- Progressive Politics
