= Internet radio licensing =

Type of radio broadcast licence

An Internet radio license is a specific type of broadcast license that allows the licensee to operate an Internet radio station. The licensing authority and number of licenses required varies from country to country, with some countries requiring multiple to cover various areas of a station's operation, and other countries not having stringent licensing procedures in place. Licensing costs also vary, based on the number of listeners that a station has, as well as other factors such as the number of songs played, the number of broadcast hours, and whether tracks are dubbed to a digital playout system.

Licensing fees for Internet radio have often been the subject of controversy. For example, in 1998, the passing of the Digital Millennium Copyright Act meant that US-based Internet radio and satellite radio stations would have to pay separate royalties to recording artists and sound recording copyright owners, unlike traditional over-the-air stations that paid royalties only for the use of the underlying musical works. This led to the creation of the SaveNetRadio.org petition group, in addition to the proposal of the Internet Radio Equality Act.

In some countries, stations which broadcast via other mediums – for example, by AM, FM and DAB digital radio – typically must also obtain a separate broadcast license in order to simultaneously broadcast via the Internet.

Multimedia content is intellectual property. These regulations on this property differ from country to country; however, the general rule is that the station must own, or have a license to broadcast the content that is covered under copyright regulations. Content that has been released under some creative commons licenses, public domain or similar can be streamed with no special content licensing requirements. However the content licensed under non-free cultural Creative Commons licenses with non-commercial (NC) clause cannot be streamed if Internet broadcast station has any form of advertising, either in the stream or on the station website.

== Internet radio licensing by country ==
=== Netherlands ===
Internet radio licensing in the Netherlands is partially dealt with by the main Dutch royalty body BUMA/STEMRA, which charges a fixed fee in order for a station to broadcast via the Internet.

=== United Kingdom ===
In the United Kingdom, Internet radio stations may obtain licenses from both the MCPS-PRS Alliance and Phonographic Performance Limited. These licences are optional, in that they are only required to compensate rights holders (a legal requirement). For a station broadcasting only libre or original content works, a licence isn't required to operate an internet radio station and no Ofcom Licence is required for Internet broadcasting.

Although the fees for the MCPS-PRS Alliance is largely fixed, the fees for Phonographic Performance Limited is calculated based on the number of tracks played per hour, in addition to the number of listeners (calculated via Internet radio audience measurement). In addition to these two main licenses, stations may also pay the PPL dubbing fee in order to store those tracks to a hard-drive or other storage device for playout, and the MCPS-PRS TV and Radio Advertisement License in order to use commercial copyrighted music in advertisements and promotional pieces. The multitude of licenses required, and the accumulative cost of them all, have priced many small stations out of running sustainably via Internet mediums with the exception of stations that play solely freely licensed content.

=== Hungary ===
In Hungary, internet radio stations must obtain licences both the Association of Hungarian Record Companies and the Artisjus Hungarian Copyright Protection Association. They have fixed fees, that means cca. 95 EUR per month together, plus 4% of the Income of the station. In 2015 Rendőrség (English: ′Guard of Order′ or Police) in coordinated action was raided more than 200 'illegal' stations, seized streaming servers, PCs. 1–2 years later the owners were charged with violation of copyright law. Since the new Media Law was adopted in 2011, Internet Stations must obtain a special licence from the NMHH (National Media and Communications Authority) by sending the exact schedule and financial plan. According to the plans, licensed internet radio stations are required to include music made in Hungary 35% of broadcasting time, and must send weekly reports from the aired contents to the Authority, like FM stations now.

=== North America ===
Neither the Federal Communications Commission (FCC) in the United States nor the Canadian Radio-Television and Telecommunications Commission (CRTC) in Canada currently require a licence for broadcasts via the Internet originating in their respective countries. However, stations that play recorded music are required to pay licensing fees or royalties through ASCAP, BMI, or SESAC, depending upon which organization licensed the recording. SoundExchange also works with music industry partners in the United States and around the world to collect performance royalties generated through airplay on Internet radio stations.

Stations that broadcast only via the Internet may voluntarily register for a standardised identifier or call sign through Internet Radio Uniform Callsign (IRUC), an industry organisation that provides the system as a means to efficiently catalog participating stations in the United States, Canada and Mexico; these call signs are not mandatory and are not a license to broadcast and do not exempt the broadcaster from paying music licensing fees. IRUC's system utilizes standardised call sign prefixes as allocated by the International Telecommunication Union (ITU).
