= Internet talk radio =

Internet talk radio (also Internet radio show) is an audio broadcasting service transmitted via the Internet. Broadcasting radio shows on the internet is usually preferred to webcasting since it is not transmitted broadly through wireless means. It mainly works by Internet radio transmissions. (Internet radio services are usually accessible from anywhere in the world—for example, one could listen to an Australian station from Europe or America. Some major networks like Clear Channel in the US and Chrysalis in the UK restrict listening to in country because of music licensing and advertising concerns.)

== History ==
In 1993, Carl Malamud launched Internet talk radio which was the "first computer-radio talk show, each week interviewing a computer expert." This was Internet radio only insofar as it was conceptually a radio show on the Internet. As late as 1995, Internet talk radio was not available via multicast streaming; it was distributed "as audio files that computer users fetch one by one." However Malamud was among the foremost proponents of multicasting technology. In late 1994, his Internet Multicasting Service was set to launch RTFM, a multicast Internet radio news station. In January 1995, RTFM's news programming was expanded to include "live audio feeds from the House and Senate floors."

A 1995 UK experiment in Internet talk radio was set up by Marc Eisenstadt and colleagues at the Open University's Knowledge Media Institute in collaboration with the BBC's Open University Production Unit. Called "KMi Maven Of The Month" (maven = expert or connoisseur), the events featured interviews with experts in Human Computer Interaction, New Media and Artificial Intelligence, and deployed a combination of streaming audio, web-chat, phone-ins and live video. The first event, an interview with Henry Lieberman of the MIT Media Lab, took place on 18 October 1995. That event used a mixture of least-common-denominator technology available at that time: 14.4 kbit/s dialup modems, Netscape, RealAudio, CU-SeeMe, email, web forms and chat windows for questioners, as well as landline telephony to connect questioners to the live audio stream after they had provided their phone numbers to the production team.

== See also ==
- Comparison of streaming media systems
- Community radio
- Electronic commerce
- Internet radio
- Internet radio audience measurement
- Internet radio device
- Internet radio licensing
- Internet television
- Radio music ripping
- Simulcast
- TuneIn
