= Diamond Dave Whitaker =

American poet, author and radio host (1937–2026)

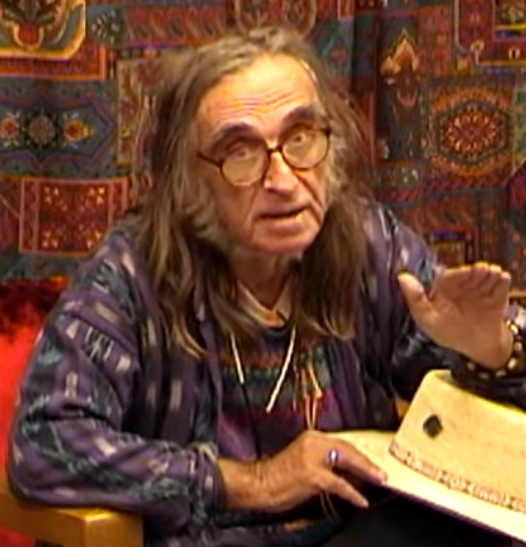
- Whitaker in a 2017 interview
- Born: David Whitaker; November 12, 1937; Cleveland, Ohio, US
- Died: March 2, 2026 (aged 88)
- Occupations: Poet, writer, radio host, activist

David "Diamond Dave" Whitaker (November 12, 1937 – March 2, 2026) was an American poet, author, radio host, activist and community organizer associated with several generations of San Francisco counterculture, including the Beat movement, the hippie era, punk subculture, community radio and grassroots political activism. He was known for hosting the open-mic radio program Common Thread Collective on the San Francisco community station Mutiny Radio (and its predecessor Pirate Cat Radio), as well as for organizing poetry events and political activism in the city for more than six decades.

Whitaker was also notable for his early connection to singer-songwriter Bob Dylan, whom he met in Minnesota in the early 1960s. Dylan later referenced Whitaker in his 2004 memoir Chronicles: Volume One, recalling that Whitaker introduced him to the work of folk singer Woody Guthrie.

== Early life ==
Whitaker was born in Cleveland, Ohio, on November 12, 1937, and grew up largely in Minnesota.

As a young man he became involved in local folk music and literary circles. During this period he was introduced by Bonnie Beecher to future singer-songwriter Bob Dylan (then Robert Zimmerman) in Minnesota. According to later accounts by Whitaker and others, Dylan first met at Whitaker's house where musicians and political activists like Marv Davidov gathered to share music and ideas and consume cannabis.

Whitaker was credited with introducing Dylan to the writing of Woody Guthrie, including Guthrie's autobiography Bound for Glory, which Dylan later cited as an important influence on his musical development. Several early Bob Dylan tapes were reportedly recorded in Whitaker's Minneapolis home.

In 1957, at the age of 19, Whitaker hitchhiked from Minnesota to San Francisco after reading about the emerging Beat poetry scene there in The Nation magazine. He also lived briefly on a kibbutz in Israel in 1958 but had returned to Minneapolis by 1961 and San Francisco by 1966.

== San Francisco counterculture ==
After arriving in San Francisco and working as a bike messenger, Whitaker became involved with the city's Beat and later hippie cultural scenes in both North Beach and the Haight-Ashbury District. He spent time among writers and artists connected to the Beat movement and later participated in political and artistic networks associated with the city's counterculture including involvement with the Rainbow Family, the Diggers, and the Black Man's Free Store in the Fillmore District. He met Lawrence Ferlinghetti, Jack Kerouac, Neal Cassady, Richard Brautigan, Ken Kesey, and "Father of the Beats" Kenneth Rexroth.

"Diamond Dave" traveled to Paris and met French thinkers like Cornelius Castoriadis, witnessed Dr. Martin Luther King Jr.'s "I Have A Dream" speech in Washington, D.C. in 1963, rode the Furthur bus to the Human Be-In in 1967, and attended the "Death of the Hippies" funeral during the Summer of Love. Whitaker was a fixture of radical gatherings such as anarchists bookfairs. He was part of a 1989 peace camp against U.S. Department of Energy's nuclear test site outside Mercury, Nevada.

Whitaker remained part of community activism throughout the following decades. He was often seen at Bay Area protests and punk shows starting from the 1960s. He was associated with San Francisco's Community Congress, a coalition of activists that convened in 1975 to discuss issues including housing, criminal justice, and arts policy. The group advocated for Proposition T in 1976, which introduced district-based elections for the city's Board of Supervisors.

Whitaker was also known for organizing inclusive poetry readings and public cultural events including Poetry Under the Dome, San Francisco's largest open-mic poetry gathering which was held at San Francisco City Hall from its beginning in 2005; "Diamond Dave" participated until 2025. John Avalos, Aaron Peskin and David Campos made appearances at these events.

=== Community radio ===
Whitaker was involved in community broadcasting for many years as one of the first hosts and organizers of independent Bay Area station KPOO 98.5 serving low-income communities. He co-hosted the weekly three-hour open-mic radio program Common Thread Collective, which aired from San Francisco's Mission District. The show featured spoken-word poetry, music, political expression, and discussions with local and international artists and activists. The program originally aired on Pirate Cat Radio, a community-run pirate radio station, and later continued on Mutiny Radio after Pirate Cat ceased terrestrial broadcasting. Along with fellow DJs, Whitaker participated in and reported on the Occupy Wall Street and other protest movements, even camping at Embarcadero Plaza.

His eccentric style of verbal delivery consisted of improvisational stream-of-consciousness rhyming poetry and he was known for catchphrases such as "don't panic, keep it organic", "history, herstory, and hipstory", "doing more together than any of us can do on our own", "strangers become friends, friends become family, family becomes community", and "cast a wide net and find the common thread."

=== Education and civic engagement ===
Whitaker maintained an active presence at City College of San Francisco, where he took regular classes and participated in student government activities. He served several terms as the oldest senator in the Associated Student Council and helped organize student protests in defense of the college during the accreditation crisis in 2012.

== Later life and death ==
Whitaker had nine children. He quit drinking alcohol in 2001 with the help of the Intertribal Friendship House in Oakland. Whitaker lived surrounded by books in what was described as an artist's commune in southeast San Francisco, despite Bay Area crackdowns on unwarranted housing after the lethal Ghost Ship warehouse fire of 2016 in Oakland. From there he continued to volunteer with Food Not Bombs.

Whitaker died on March 2, 2026, at the age of 88. Obituaries described him as a long-standing figure in San Francisco's artistic and activist communities whose life spanned many phases of the city's countercultural history. A memorial was held on Hippie Hill in Golden Gate Park. Whitaker was often described by local journalists and community members as a living link between multiple eras of San Francisco's cultural history, including the Beat, hippie, and later grassroots arts movements.

== Recognition ==
In recognition of his decades of cultural and political activity in San Francisco, the San Francisco Board of Supervisors proclaimed February 2, 2016, as "Diamond Dave Whitaker Day". London Breed called Whitaker a "true San Francisco treasure." The proclamation cited his work as a poet, radio host, activist, and advocate for marginalized communities.

== See also ==
- KPOO
- Mutiny Radio
- Pirate Cat Radio
- Beat Generation
- Folk Music
- Hippie Movement
