= Radio Neshat =

- Melbourne; Australia

Programming
- Language: Persian

Ownership
- Owner: Masoud Zoohori, Ehsan Hayati

History
- Founded: April 2014
- First air date: January 8, 2015

Links
- Website: www.radioneshat.com

Radio Neshat is an Internet radio station owned by Neshat Media. It is the only round-the-clock broadcasting media that broadcasts in Persian in Australia. In October 2026, Radio Neshat received the Victorian Multicultural Awards for Excellence in recognition of efforts to empower migrants and refugees, promote social cohesion, and foster lasting ties between multicultural communities and Australian institutions.

== Establishment ==
Radio Neshat was founded in April 2014. Registration of the company by the Australian Securities and Investments Commission took place in September of the same year and Radio started its broadcast on 8 January 2015. Radio Neshat was established "with the aim of creating a happy and friendly atmosphere for Persian-speaking people in Australia".
