= Radioio =

Internet radio service

RadioIO
- Formation: 1998
- Founder: Michael R. Roe
- Founded at: St. Augustine, Florida, USA
- Legal status: Company
- Headquarters: New York City, USA
- Region served: International
- Services: Radio streaming
- Fields: Mass Media
- Official language: English
- Parent organization: RadioIO, Inc.
- Website: www.radioio.com
- Formerly called: SHOUTcast (1998-1999); RadioA3 (1999-2001)

RadioIO (pronounced “radio eye-oh”) is a New York–based internet radio and streaming media service owned by RadioIO, Inc. (RAIO) started in 1998. It was the first Internet radio company to be publicly traded.

RadioIO broadcasts over 100 music and talk-show hosted channels. RadioIO's music programming ranges from genre channels such as “Classic Rock” and “Today’s Pop” to formats such as “Ambient” and “Reggae.” RadioIO music channels are managed by “StreamHosts,” with FJ Forest (Musical Starstreams), Robert Goodman (DJ/producer), Doug Wendt (Midnight Dread),

RadioIO's internet radio service can be found at its website or via media streaming devices.

RadioIO's Business Music, an internet streaming music service, was launched in 2008 as IO Business Music (www.iobusinessmusic.com), a wholly owned subsidiary of RadioIO, Inc. It provides in-store music and offers branded as well as non-branded business music channels carrying local and national advertising. It is used by many national chains such as quick service restaurants, spas, hospitals, airports, hotels, casinos, auto dealers, and specialty retailers.

== History ==
In 1998, Internet broadcaster, Michael R. Roe, launched a single SHOUTcast stream after starting it as a hobby out of a spare bedroom in St. Augustine, Florida. The following year, Roe named it RadioA3 (a radio industry term meaning “adult album alternative” music), and in 2001, again changed the name to RadioIO (IO meaning “internet only”). As one of the founders of Voice of Webcasters (VoW), Roe along with a grass-roots group of small webcasters, organized the first “Day of Silence” protests against the high royalty fees for Internet radio in 2002 and 2007. In July 2009, RadioIO, Digitally Imported, and AccuRadio reached a revenue-sharing deal with royalty collector SoundExchange securing music rights.

RadioIO's audience increased. The first internet radio audience listener metrics were produced in 2002 by Arbitron Webcast Ratings and Measurecast Communications’ Internet Radio Report. RAIN (Radio and Internet Newsletter) reported on June 14, 2002, that RadioIO was ranked number 10 (260,800 ATH Arbitron; 284,313 TTSL Measurecast).” In December 2002, RadioIO partnered with Limelight Networks and Apple to deliver the world’s first QuickTime 6 / MPEG-4–based, live internet radio broadcast. Based on total listening hours logged, RadioIO's "Eclectic" channel was listed as the second most popular web music channel by Arbitron Measurecast in December 2002. By March 2006, RadioIO was streaming 20 proprietary music channels. It later increased to over 100 music and talk channels. On December 18, 2013, RadioIO, Inc. started delivering its content through Triton Digital.

RadioIO became the first publicly held internet radio operation on September 22, 2005, when it was acquired by PowerCerv Corporation, and then renamed ioWorldMedia, Incorporated. On September 3, 2013, a corporate organizational restructuring brought Julia Miller, a former Apple and Microsoft (Xbox) executive, and Zach McAdoo, a Principal of McAdoo Capital, on as board members. In October 2013, the shareholders of ioWorldMedia (IWDM) approved its merger with RadioIO, Inc., which subsequently began trading common stock under the ticker symbol "RDIO" on the OTC market on January 10, 2014. On March 17, 2014, the OTC modified the RDIO ticker to RAIO.

By March 2014, Radioio had ceased to provide consumer music and focused on talk radio, featuring personalities such as Bubba the Love Sponge and Miles "The Shoe" Schuman.

== See also ==
- List of internet radio stations
- Tune In
