= Traxx Radio =

Programming
- Format: Indie, Indie Rock, Indie Pop, Shoegaze, Alternative

History
- First air date: March 2008

Links
- Website: www.traxxradio.com

Traxx Radio, stylised as traxx, was an independent digital media broadcaster based in Brisbane, Australia. Its mission statement was "to support independent artists by connecting listeners to music that has meaning for them". It first started broadcasting in March 2008.

== Programming and content ==
The station primarily broadcast indie rock, indie pop and other indie subgenres. It broadcast live from its Brisbane studio 24 hours a day via two MP3 streams—56 kbit/s and 128 kbit/s. It used Icecast streaming technology. Its programming consisted of one weekly, locally produced flagship programme and four pre-packaged programmes from podcast producers around the world. The remainder of its schedule was solely indie music, with occasional live presentation by its staff.

The station was often credited by independent artists for supporting their career.
