= RadioVeRVe =

The RadioVeRVe Logo

RadioVeRVe is a defunct internet radio station operated out of Bangalore, India. It differentiated itself from other FM and internet radio stations by focusing exclusively on independent music from India.

It addressed the common problem that independent artistes face all over the world – mainstream radio doesn't play their music, so reach is limited. The RadioVeRVe team decided to pool their talents together and create a venture, India's first Internet radio station dedicated wholly to independent (or indie) Indian music.

First launched on 1 June 2006, RadioVeRVe originally launched as a platform to showcase rock music performed by unpublished bands in India, and to feature music performed by these bands, as well as interviews and news about them. It has since widened its musical scope to rock, heavy metal, easy listening, regional language and Indian classical music.

The station has received interest from both the press as well as the music industry in India, and caters to thousands of listeners across the world 24 hours a day. Artistes featured on the station credit it with being responsible for their reaching audiences that they had not hoped to reach earlier, and getting record label offers, shows and even international tours.

== Station content ==
To be featured on RadioVeRVe, artistes or bands needed to be independent (or indie) Indian bands or musicians creating original music and with no formal affiliation to record labels as yet. The artistes had to be located in India—to avoid commercial conflicts, the station did not play music performed by Indian artistes not located in India.

Shows were RJ'd, with some hours reserved for the "Randomizer", where music was played at random from the huge database of songs available. As songs were played, information was displayed about the performer on the website, including links to their websites and other contact information, allowing listeners to take up contact with the artists for the purchase of their CDs, booking them for shows, recording contracts, etc.

== History ==
The station, which ran in non-commercial mode, was run by Gaurav Vaz, a well known musician in Bangalore and Shreyas Srinivasan, an active FOSS developer, with financial support from employers and well wishers, and operational and content (RJ) inputs from friends and volunteers. The infrastructure for the station was completely based on open source software.

Founded by Kaustubh Srikanth, the station actually started as an experiment called "Infinity Radio" in late 2005, with a broadcast of about two hours of content every weekday night, RJ'd live over the net. This was found to be a limiting factor, as the station could be heard by only few people, and technological problems threw up roadblocks. They later, with the help of their friend Atul Chitnis, started to record and ‘can’ shows, setting them up for a bigger presence online, recording in Chitnis's basement studio.

In June 2006, the site launched as a 24x7 channel, adopting the name "RadioVeRVe". (The strange capitalization of the name is intentional and part of the station's "branding"). From a few dozen listeners, RadioVerve’s audience went up to hundreds overnight as the operation eventually moved to a round-the-clock mode.

In early 2007, the project received a big boost by securing sponsorship from Indian IT firm Geodesic Information Systems.

The channel took a conscious decision not to offer music downloads, and in early 2007 began establishing partnerships with existing retail outlets that offered independent music, such as Music Yogi, to allow listeners to buy the music they were hearing.

In June 2007, RadioVeRVe expanded to seven channels, showcasing both rock as well as regional language and non-rock music.

- RadioVeRVe – the main channel, featuring mixed content
- Rock – Rock music
- Metal – Heavy metal music
- Gospel – Gospel Music
- Konkani – Konkani Language Music
- Easy – Easy Listening Music
- Classical – Indian Classical Music

The station later announced that they would be adding more regional-language channels, as well as a folk music channels.

== Tuning in ==
The station's channels could be listened to both in the browser (via the RadioVeRVe website) as well as through traditional streaming using internet radio client applications and devices. Streams were available in low-bandwidth (suitable for use on mobile GPRS connections) as well as high-bandwidth (suitable for Wi-Fi or broadband connections) versions. The streams were only available in the MP3 format. Information about the streams was available on the website.
