= Reggae Rajahs =

Reggae musicians

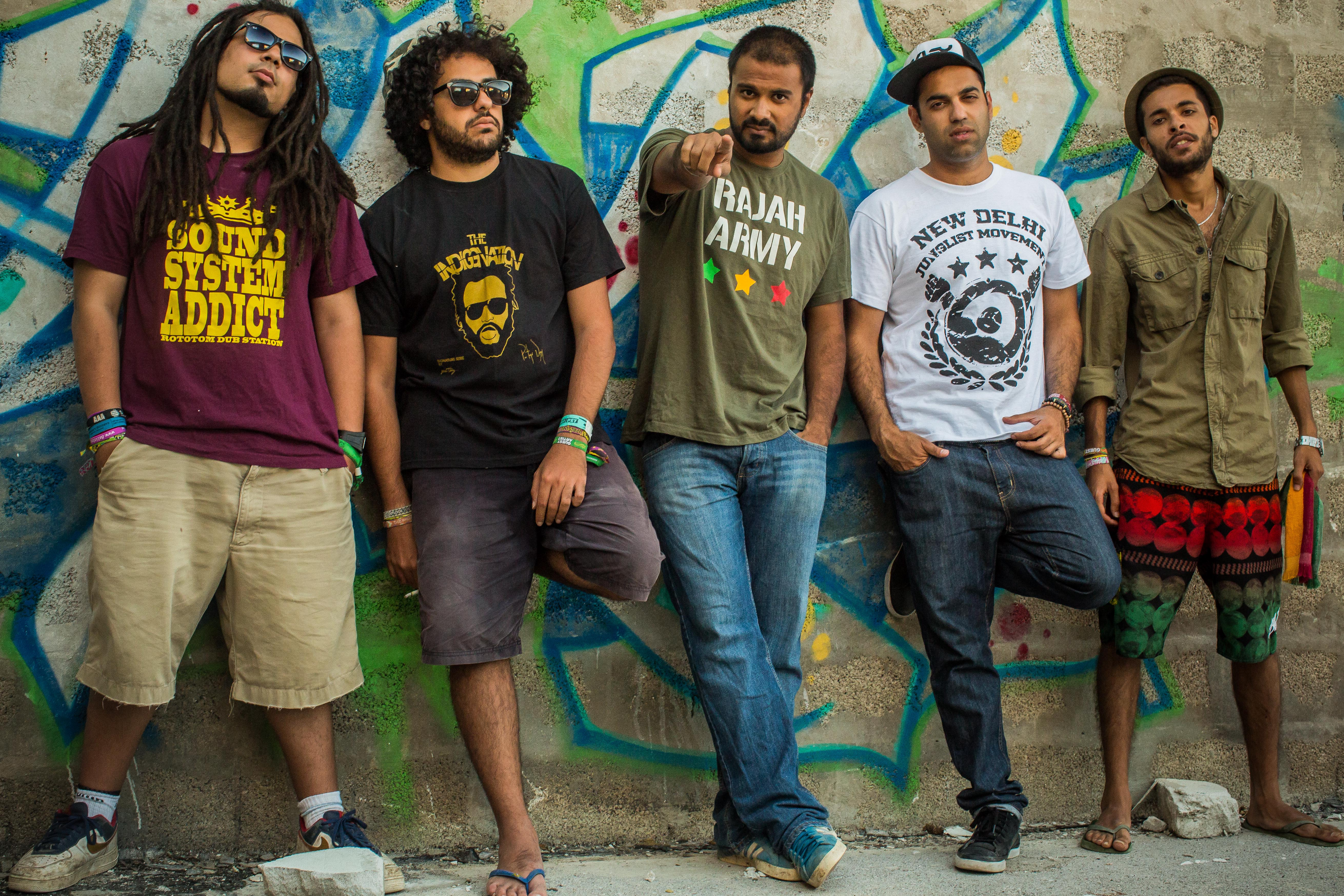

Background information
- Also known as: India's First Reggae Sound
- Origin: New Delhi, India
- Genres: Reggae, Dancehall, Bass music
- Years active: 2009 – present
- Members: General Zooz; Diggy Dang; DJ MoCity; Ziggy The Blunt; BeLights
- Website: reggaerajahs.com

Reggae Rajahs are a reggae and bass music sound system crew based in New Delhi, India. They are the first Jamaican style sound system in and from India, and they introduced Caribbean slang and vocabulary to audiences all over the country. They received a nomination for the "Best International Band / Group" award at the British Reggae Industry Awards.

== History ==
After hosting a Bob Marley tribute party in February 2009, Mo (DJ Mo City) met Raghav Dang (Diggy Dang) and Zorawar Shukla (General Zooz), who together launched Reggae Rajahs, India's first reggae sound system in New Delhi. The crew later added Ziggy B and BeLights as additional members in 2015.

== Performances ==
Reggae Rajahs performed at various events around the world; Europe, South America, and Southeast Asia. They initiated their very own Goa Sunsplash Festival in 2016. After their debut at Goa Sunsplash, they also toured other major events in India including the Pune Supersonic festival.

== Collaboration ==
Reggae Rajahs performed live with Snoop Dogg and Major Lazer. The other notable names that they have shared the stage with include Dub Inc., Million Stylez, Ziggi Recado, Tippa Irie, Apache Indian, Mr Williamz, Brother Culture, Soom T, Deadly Hunta, Mungo's HI Fi, Gaudi, Dub Phyzix, Supa Bassie & Sargento Garcia, Subatomic Sound, South Rakkas Crew and Dreadsquad. In 2013 they launched Pressure Drop, a radio cast that helped the group gain an international fanbase and helped the crew get invited to play in places like Brazil, Poland and the Philippines. Pressure Drop plays on boxout.fm, an online radio station which was started by another rajah, DJ MoCity.

=== Poland ===
Reggae Rajahs have built up a fan base in Poland by working with the Polish Institute in New Delhi, which facilitated their collaboration with Polish acts such as Marika, Dreadsquad, and other Polish artists. Their popularity in Poland increased when they visited in August 2013, playing at Ostroda Reggae Festival.
