= Fréquence3 =

French Internet radio station

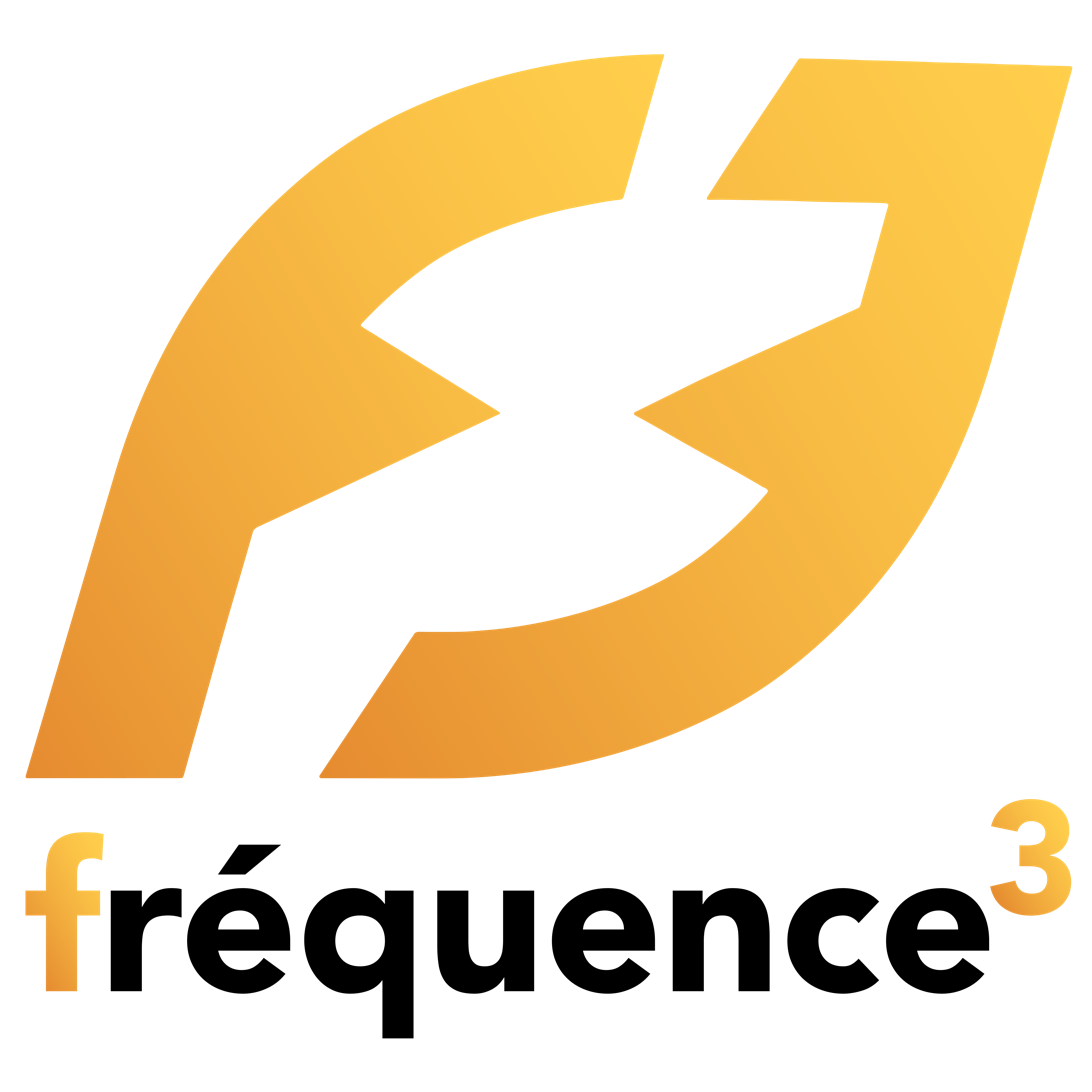

History
- First air date: April 15, 2001

Links
- Website: http://www.frequence3.fr/

Fréquence3 is a French webradio station.

== History ==
In 1998, founder Alexandre Martinat began broadcasting a weekly program on Saturday nights, and assembled a team to turn the show into a 24-hour radio station.

Frequence3 was founded by this group on 15 April 2001, on the basis of an initial webradio called "Europe3". It was later renamed Fréquence3, as the first name was already registered. At that time, only 30 listeners could listen to the station at once.

In 2002, the station developed technically with the addition of new servers for more users to listen, and a mobile antenna to cover events outside the studio, and had its first guests. The Frequence3 operation relocated to France from Belgium.

Frequence3 was a leading organisation in the launch of the National Association of France Webradios on 14 March 2006, to promote recognition of the medium.

On 21 June 2006, Frequence3 launched a second music stream, "F3 - Only 90's", with a program consisting solely of music from the 1990s.

On 17 October 2006, Frequency3 began national distribution, beyond its broadcast via Frequence3.fr, through channel 99 on the proposed Freebox service.

In January 2007, Nicolas Moulin, Secretary since 2005, replaced Alexandre Martinat as President of Frequence3.

Since 15 February 2007, Frequence3 has been broadcasting the radio program of the Paris Graduate School of Journalism (ESJ), "Frequence ESJ", which includes university information. On 3 March 2007, the station united all of its activities into larger premises at the ESJ Paris. On 2 July 2007, Alexandre Martinat resigned from his post as director of air. Alexis Thiebaut, then coordinator of antenna, replaced Martinat in the direction of antenna.

In January 2008, Benjamin Poulin was elected as President. On 15 May 2008, another stream was launched, "F3 - Mixarena". On 24 May 2008, after seven years with the slogan "A Burst of Tubes", they adopted the new slogan "Hits On Line". The F3 logo was also redesigned.

On 6 July 2008, Alexis Thiebaut resigned from his post as director of air, replaced by Vincent Tabard and Stéphane Liger.

On 3 December 2008, Frequence3 launched a new version of its website. A webpage tab "Frequence3TV" was operated during the 2008 Telethon.

On 14 February 2009, to mark Valentine's Day, Frequence3 launched a new beta radio link, "F3 - Love & Sex".
