= RadioJoyAlukkas.com =

Internet radio website in Malayalam language

RadioJoyAlukkas.com was an internet radio website in Malayalam language, operated by the Joy Alukkas group. The website started functioning from November 6, 2007.

The radio had 24/7 entertainment, live breaking news times, interviews with celebrities, shows anchored by film and television stars besides comedy shows hosted by Comedians. Good Morning Kerala, open the day's proceedings and follow with news time. 'Hello Joy Alukkas' was the popular program in the channel anchored by Asha Latha and Balakrishnan. It was one of the front line internet radio in Malayalam. The radio brings songs in Tamil and Hindi as well.

The RadioJoyAlukkas operated its service from Dubai Media City. It was registered under Joyalukkas, Dubai, a company dealing in the wholesale and retail marketing of Diamonds and Gold.
