= VirtualDJ Radio =

- Website type: Webradio
- Available in: Multi-language
- Owner: VirtualDJRadio
- Website: virtualdjradio.com
- Registration: optional
- Launched: 2 November 2004
- Current status: Online
- Content license: free

VirtualDJ Radio is a live mixed web radio featuring DJs from around the world.

It began in 2005 with a single channel, where DJs primarily mixed house and dance music. In 2008, a new channel was introduced for DJs mixing urban music, including hip-hop, dancehall and reggaeton. In 2010, a third channel was introduced for trance, minimal, progressive house, tech house and more. As of June 2011, it had over 24,000 members.

VirtualDJ Radio supports most major media players, including iTunes, Winamp and RealPlayer. Listeners can also tune in using digital radio devices and phone apps, utilising the standard Shoutcast and Radiotime directories.
