= Radioseven =

Swedish Internet radio station

- Sweden

Programming
- Format: Dance music

Ownership
- Owner: Seven Broadcasting

History
- First air date: August 8, 1999
- Last air date: April 2017

Links
- Website: www.radioseven.se www.radioseven.org

Radioseven was a Swedish Internet radio station, operated by the non-profit association Seven Broadcasting. Radioseven was concentrated on broadcasting mainly dance music, with appearances of live program hosts during peak hours. It stopped broadcasting in April 2017.

The station, originally named 7UP-Radio, started broadcasting on August 8, 1999. It was a young Swede named Patrick Westerlund, who together with friends he had met on the IRC network DALnet, started the radio as a hobby project. Over the years the station has striven to become more serious and professional. Some of these steps are the renaming of 7UP-Radio to Radioseven in February 2002, and the establishment of the non-profit association Seven Broadcasting.

During the autumn of 2005, Seven Broadcasting launched two new online radio stations: the house and trance oriented Mysteria: The Club Experience, and ICE playing mostly hip hop and modern R'n'B. These two stations had to be shut down after about six months due to high license fees and the limited economic resources of Seven Broadcasting.

Radioseven has for several years been a partner of the LAN party Dreamhack. During Dreamhack Winter in 2006, the station broadcast over FM for the first time and could be heard all over Jönköping where Dreamhack is held, on 107.0 MHz. It was closed in 2017 because they did not have money.

The magazine Internetworld ranked Radioseven's website as one of the 100 best in Sweden during 2004 and 2005. In 2006, The Swedish Radio Academy awarded its Special Award to Radioseven.

On, or around, April 25, 2017, Radioseven posted a farewell message on their site in English and Swedish.
