= Lookbook.nu =

Defunct fashion blog website

LOOKBOOK.nu
- Website type: Fashion blog, photoblog
- Available in: English
- Creator: Yuri Lee
- Website: http://lookbook.nu
- Launched: 2008; 18 years ago
- Current status: Inaccessible since late September 2023

"Lookbook.nu" was a fashion, youth culture, and community website, created by Yuri Lee in San Francisco. It was inspired by street fashion websites and blogs such as The Sartorialist and The Cobrasnake and designed for users to post their own street-fashion photography, featuring themselves and their outfits. One fashion writer called the site the "Digg.com for fashion insiders."

== Lookbook ==
The website was free and allowed everyone to join (a change from their original invitation-only system). It allowed users to share their looks and activity on Facebook, Twitter and Tumblr. Their goal was to provide a means for diverse, real people to provide fashion inspiration to others.

Lookbook.nu claimed to have a user base of over 50,000 members and over one million unique hits per month. It was discussed in major fashion and media outlets, including The Chicago Tribune, Elle Belgium, Status magazine, and the London Evening Standard.

== Site features ==
Outfits – or "looks" – uploaded to the site by its members were scored with points, known as "hype," to judge that outfit's popularity. This scoring system was used to differentiate between the looks on a basis of what was called "karma." Karma was the average of the total number of hypes a user had received, divided by the number of different looks that user had posted. This karmic average on the site dictated how much exposure that user would receive when posting new looks.

Looks were displayed in a variety of different ways on the website. The default view of the site was via the Hot tab, which showed those looks which were most popular on the site, judged by the amount of hype they received, and their popularity on that day in competition with other looks. A second tab, New, showed all looks uploaded, with the most recent shown first. The New tab offered a feature known as the Karma Filter, which allowed for users with a higher karmic average to be featured more prominently on the feed. The Top tab featured the most popular Looks posted – and was sortable by day/week/month/year.

Registered users (on the site as well through third-party services such as Facebook and Twitter), were allowed the option of hyping and commenting on the looks posted by other members. Hyping was done anonymously to encourage all users to hype, but a user was able to make their hype public by leaving the member a comment. Members were also allowed to give Love – symbolized with a ♥ – for looks that they especially liked, and were also given an archive of the looks they have previously hyped and loved. Users were also allowed to become "fans" of other users.

Lookbook.nu also had a forum where users could post topics and join discussions. The ability to invite new members continued after the invitation-only system ended.
