= Dualist Inquiry =

Indian musician (born 1987)

Sahej Bakshi (born 1987), better known by the stage name Dualist Inquiry, is a musician, guitarist, record producer and electronic music composer, who is among a handful of Indian composers working in the EDM genre. In 2017, Bakshi was included in the Forbes 30 Under 30 list by Forbes India.

== Education ==
Bakshi attended The Doon School in Dehradun. He then received a scholarship in 2005 to pursue a bachelor's degree in music at the Thornton School of Music, University of Southern California. He then took a course in filmmaking at the Film and TV School of the Academy of Performing Arts in Prague.

== Career ==
Bakshi began his career in 2010 by joining the alt rock band 'The Pulp Society', fronted by Imaad Shah. In 2011, he played at The Great Escape Festival as an opening act for Beardyman and DJ Shadow. Bakshi released his debut EP album Dualism in 2011. He released his second album Natural Disasters in 2014. After a three-year hiatus, he released Life Forms in 2019.
