= Radio Garden =

Dutch radio and digital research project

- App Logo

- Main page of Radio Garden playing JB FM in Rio de Janeiro city as of October 2025
- Country of origin: The Netherlands
- Owner: Radio Garden B.V.
- Website: https://radio.garden
- Launched: December 2016; 9 years ago
- Current status: Online

Radio Garden is a non-profit Dutch radio and digital research project developed from 2013 to 2016 by the Netherlands Institute for Sound and Vision (under the supervision of Martin Luther University of Halle-Wittenberg's Golo Föllmer), by the Transnational Radio Knowledge Platform and five other European universities. In 2016 it provided access to nearly 8,000 radio stations and The Radio Conference 2016: Transnational Encounters said that it went viral. The service reported a collection of over 40,000 stations in 2024.

== Operation and functionality ==
The site interface shows a rotatable representation of the globe, with stations listed on clicking a location. The service is comparable in some ways to earlier long-distance shortwave listening, but stations are streamed using data packets instead of broadcast by radio waves. The home page, titled "Live", allows the user to explore the world, listening to what local stations are broadcasting at the time, with information on the country the signal is being transmitted from.

In 2018, native apps for IOS and Android were launched. In 2019, a search function was added so users could search for any station on the site by name or location.

== Concept and design ==
Within Radio Garden, radios are arranged by geolocation and grouped by cities. Available radio stations are shown on an areal view of the earth as green circles which increase in size with the region's number of broadcasters available. Once an area has been selected, the user can scroll through a list of the indexed radio stations of the region.

On 14 March 2020 a new version, with upgraded features, was released.

== Technical details ==
The site adopted the generic .garden top-level domain, which was originally intended for gardening professionals. For transmission, the signal generated by the broadcaster must be converted from radio to a digital stream, with supported formats being MP3, Ogg and AAC. The service requires an Internet connection.

== Unavailability ==
=== Turkey ===
Radio Garden has been banned in Turkey since January 2022 upon the request of Radio and Television Supreme Council (RTÜK), ordering Radio Garden to pay the license fee or to terminate their service in Turkey.

=== United Kingdom ===
As of 2022, users within the UK cannot access international radio stations, and are restricted to stations based within the country. Intended as a temporary measure, this change is now permanent due to licensing reasons and concerns around copyright laws.
