= International School of Temple Arts =

Global organization focused on spiritual aspects of sex

- Abbreviation: ISTA
- Established: 2007 (19 years ago)
- Types: nonprofit organization
- Headquarters: Sedona
- Country: United States
- Revenue: 203,273 United States dollar (2020)
- Total Assets: 930,974 United States dollar (2020)
- Website: ista.life

The International School of Temple Arts (ISTA) is an organization which describes itself as promoting sexual healing and healthy attitudes towards sex. ISTA claims its workshops address the spiritual aspects of sex.

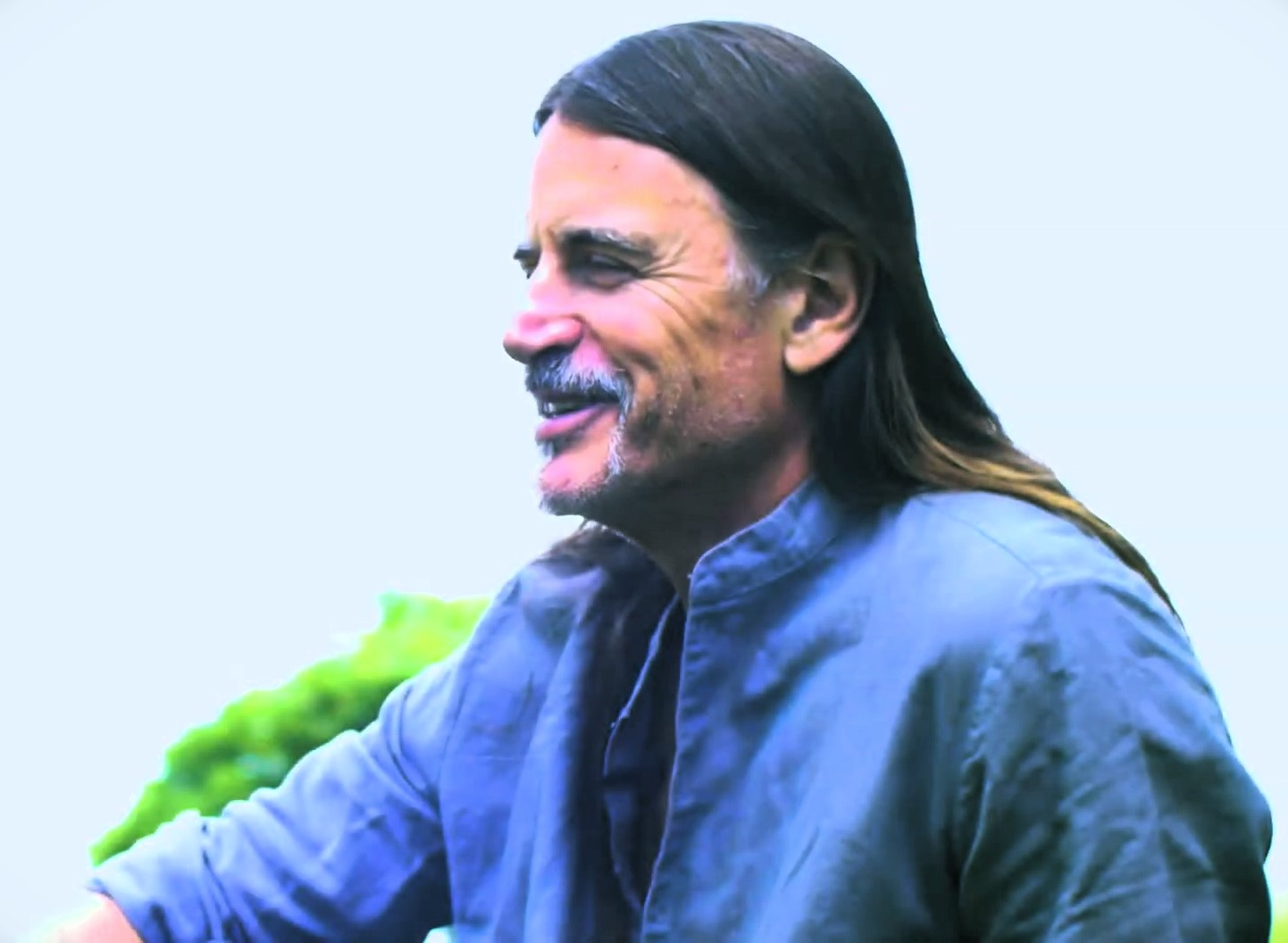
Baba Dez Nichols, the founder of ISTA, in 2019

ISTA was founded in 2007 by Baba Dez Nichols in Arizona, as a non-profit organization.

Baba Dez Nichols has not been part of ISTA leadership since 2015. He ceased facilitating ISTA trainings in 2019, and he is no longer a member of the ISTA Lead Faculty, and he left completely in 2024.

ISTA teachings are influenced by Neotantra and western interpretations of shamanism.

Claims of misconduct and sexual abuse have caused controversy and opposition to establishment of ISTA seminars at some locations.

== Controversy ==
Journalist Anke Richter stated to the Byron Shire Echo that "There was a covert harem culture at ISTA. Male pioneers surrounded themselves with young female lovers, often from their trainings, who were then accelerated to apprentices and facilitators". Some senior members of the organisation have been accused of performing sex acts on meeting participants without consent or pressuring them to consent to sex acts.

In 2021 the organisation said that they had temporary implemented a policy of not allowing Temple Training teachers to have sex with participants.

In a The Cut (New York) article several of ISTA's teachers were accused of sexual misconduct and other questionable practices. Pele Ohad Ezrahi was accused that during a 2021 party hosted by Ezrahi, a 20-year-old woman was given multiple doses of MDMA by Ezrahi and was sexually assaulted by him while drugged. There are multiple reports accusing Ezrahi of coercing sexual activities with students during ISTA events. Bruce Lyon was accused by Baba Dez in a letter dated September 2, 2024, that Lyon's Highden Temple was associated with incidents of rape, trauma, and suicide. Dez himself was accused of pressuring students into sexual activities during ISTA workshops. He allegedly also propagated the belief that sexual interactions with male leaders could be healing for women, a concept referred to by some former assistants as "the magical cock." Michal Maayan Don was accused that dismissing a claim that a female participant was raped during a ritual at a Level 2 training, suggesting that everyone has a "predator" inside them and implying that the participant's experience was due to her own inner imbalance.

Additionally, several former seminar participants reported they have suffered from psychosis due to their participation in ISTA seminars.

=== ISTA's Response to Controversy ===
In November 2024, ISTA issued a public response addressing controversies related to its activities. These included claims and reports featured in European and New Zealand media outlets, allegations that ISTA operates as a cult, and a declaration about the organization made by the Israeli Center for Cult Victims. This also addressed public support for the declaration by Steven Hassan, a recognized expert on cult dynamics, who vocally criticised ISTA for their activities. Additionally, ISTA responded to allegations of harassment by critics targeting its venues, staff, and participants, as well as accusations concerning ceremonial animal sacrifice rituals and Satanism at its trainings. Finally, the organization clarified its involvement in the planned "Shamanic Love Camp", an event proposed to take place at Auschwitz concentration camp, which ultimately did not occur. ISTA said it had implemented new accountability policies to deal with complaints about misconduct. ISTA has also publicly responded to an article written in NY Magazine

== Lawsuit ==
In 2026, ISTA filed a defamation lawsuit of 3.6 million NIS (~1.2 million US dollars) against an Israeli who had raised concerns about the controversial aspects of the organization.

== See also ==
- OneTaste
- Neotantra
- Neoshamanism
- Ritual sacrifice
- Cult
- Sexual misconduct
