= WRJQ =

Programming
- Language: English
- Format: Polka

Ownership
- Owner: Aaron Schuelke

History
- First air date: January 2006

WRJQ is a polka music formatted internet radio station.

Launched in January 2006, WRJQ features a wide variety of polka music, but primarily plays the "Midwest Oompah" sound featuring the Dutchmen-style and Czech/Bohemian-style.

Aaron Schuelke from Appleton, Wisconsin, United States, owns and operates WRJQ. Studios are located in his house on the north side of Appleton.

This internet-only station is named in memory of licensed AM broadcast radio station WRJQ (1570 AM) that aired an all-polka format from September 1, 1985, until January 30, 2002. The station was bought out by Woodward Communications, Inc. and changed its format to sports radio as "WSCO".
