= JB FM =

JB FM (ZYD460)
- Rio de Janeiro; Brazil
- Frequency: 99.9 MHz

Programming
- Language: Brazilian Portuguese
- Format: Entertainment and Music

Ownership
- Owner: Grupo JB FM; (Rádio Monte da Gávea Ltda.)

History
- First air date: 1971
- Former frequencies: 99.7 MHz (1971–2012)

Technical information
- Licensing authority: ANATEL
- Class: E1
- ERP: 53.4284 kW
- Transmitter coordinates: 22°57′2.59″S 43°13′54.37″W

Links
- Public license information: Profile
- Webcast: Listen
- Website: jb.fm

JB FM (99.9 MHz) is a radio station in Rio de Janeiro, Brazil. It is located in Barra da Tijuca, at the Città Office Mall on Avenida das Américas.

== History ==
In 2009, the ANATEL announced a reorganization of frequencies for the FM band in the city of Rio de Janeiro. JB FM moved from 99.7 to 99.9 MHz on January 20, 2012, as part of the order, which also affected Rádio Melodia (97.3 to 97.5), Rádio Globo (89.3 to 89.5), and MEC FM (98.9 to 99.3).

In July 2021, JB FM teamed up with Alpha FM to launch Couvert Artístico em Casa, a new version of the live show that has already been broadcast on the radio station.
