= Blast Radio =

UK Student Radio station in Ealing, London

Coordinates: 51°30′32″N 0°18′26″W

Ealing, London, UK (United Kingdom); England
- Frequency: 87.9 FM RSL across the local area for four weeks in April

Programming
- Format: Music & Speech

Ownership
- Owner: University of West London

History
- First air date: 1994 (Tube Radio)

Links
- Webcast: listen
- Website: Blast Radio

Blast Radio (formerly known as Tube Radio) is the student radio station and Students' Union Club for University of West London. They broadcast online from studios based on campus, and on an RSL across the local area for four weeks in May. The station is a member of UK Student Radio Association.

== History ==
Originally launched in 1994 as Tube Radio it was later rebranded to its current name in 2007, bringing it in line with sister station Blast 1386AM based at the Reading campus, which was then part of Thames Valley University.

At the time it was the first University in the United Kingdom to feature two student radio stations within the same institution.

The original studios were based at Ealing Studios from launch 1994 up until February 2015 when they moved to new purpose built studios on campus within 'The Heartspace'.

== Achievements ==
The station was nominated for a "Best Station" award in 2007 and a "Best Marketing and Promotion" award in 2009, at the annual Student Radio Awards.
