= Blast 1386AM =

- Reading; England
- Frequency: 1386AM

Programming
- Format: Music & Speech

Ownership
- Owner: Reading College

History
- First air date: 2002

Blast1386 was the student radio station for Reading College. They previously broadcast locally from their Kings Road Campus over 1386AM and online from Room A59. The station first started broadcasting in April 2002. Since February 2020 the 1386 AM transmitter has been off the air and by June 2020 the web stream had also ceased. The station currently appears to be defunct.

In 2002, Reading College started Blast 1386. When it started Blast 1386 took a sustaining station overnight but as the station grew and had more content there was no need for this and Blast 1386 began broadcasting 24 hours a day 7 days a week from their studios in the heart of Reading College.

Blast 1386 had a sister station Blast Radio from the days when 'TVU' Reading College Campus was part of University of West London.

== Awards and achievements ==
On 19 September 2005, Phill Jupitus and the entire BBC 6 Music Breakfast Show took over Blast 1386. The national digital station BBC 6 Music spent three hours broadcasting live from the Blast studios.

Also in 2005, Blast 1386 received a special Sony Radio Academy award to recognise its participation in UK Radio Aid Day, who were raising money for the tsunami appeal.
