= Internet radio audience measurement =

Internet radio audience measurement is any method used to determine the number of people listening to an Internet radio broadcast. This information is usually obtained from the broadcaster's audio streaming server. Icecast, Nicecast, and SHOUTcast are examples of audio streaming servers that can provide listener statistics for audience measurement. These numbers often include information such as listeners' IP addresses, the media player they are using, how long they listened, and their computer's operating system.

This approach differs greatly from terrestrial radio audience measurement. Demographic and psychographic information cannot be easily collected due to geographically diverse nature of typical Internet radio audiences. Arbitron, a research company in the United States which collects listener data on terrestrial radio audiences, has begun collecting listener data for Internet radio stations based on a panel of 200,000 users. The statistics collected from those users is then projected against the estimated 52 million actual Internet radio listeners.

DigitalRadioTracker.com (DRT) has developed a proprietary system that monitors Internet Radio as well as select Terrestrial FM, College & Non-Commercial radio compiling the airplay of songs around the globe. They monitor 5000+ radio stations. DRT Reports provides users with detailed information of when, where and how often songs are being played on the radio as well as what version of the song (vital for remixes and mash ups). They offer free weekly charts for Top 200, Top 125 Independent, Top International, Top 50 Pop, Top 50 R&B/HipHop, Top 50 Country, Top 50 Christian/Gospel, Top 50 Adult Contemporary, and Top 50 Rock.

Another company named Triton Digital, a software company in the United States also measures worldwide Internet radio audience. It uses actual data collected from streaming servers rather than estimated data.

StreamAnalyst is a web-based service (SaaS) that generates audience statistics reports for Internet radio and other streamed contents.

NeuroMedia Software, also offer CasterStats, a cloud based analytics as well as an on-premises version that can combine audience of podcasts and also radio on TV. The tool is currently in comparative studies such as CIM RSM and the Danish Podcastindex.
