= Pirate Cat Radio =

Community radio station in California

KPCR-LP and KMRT-LP
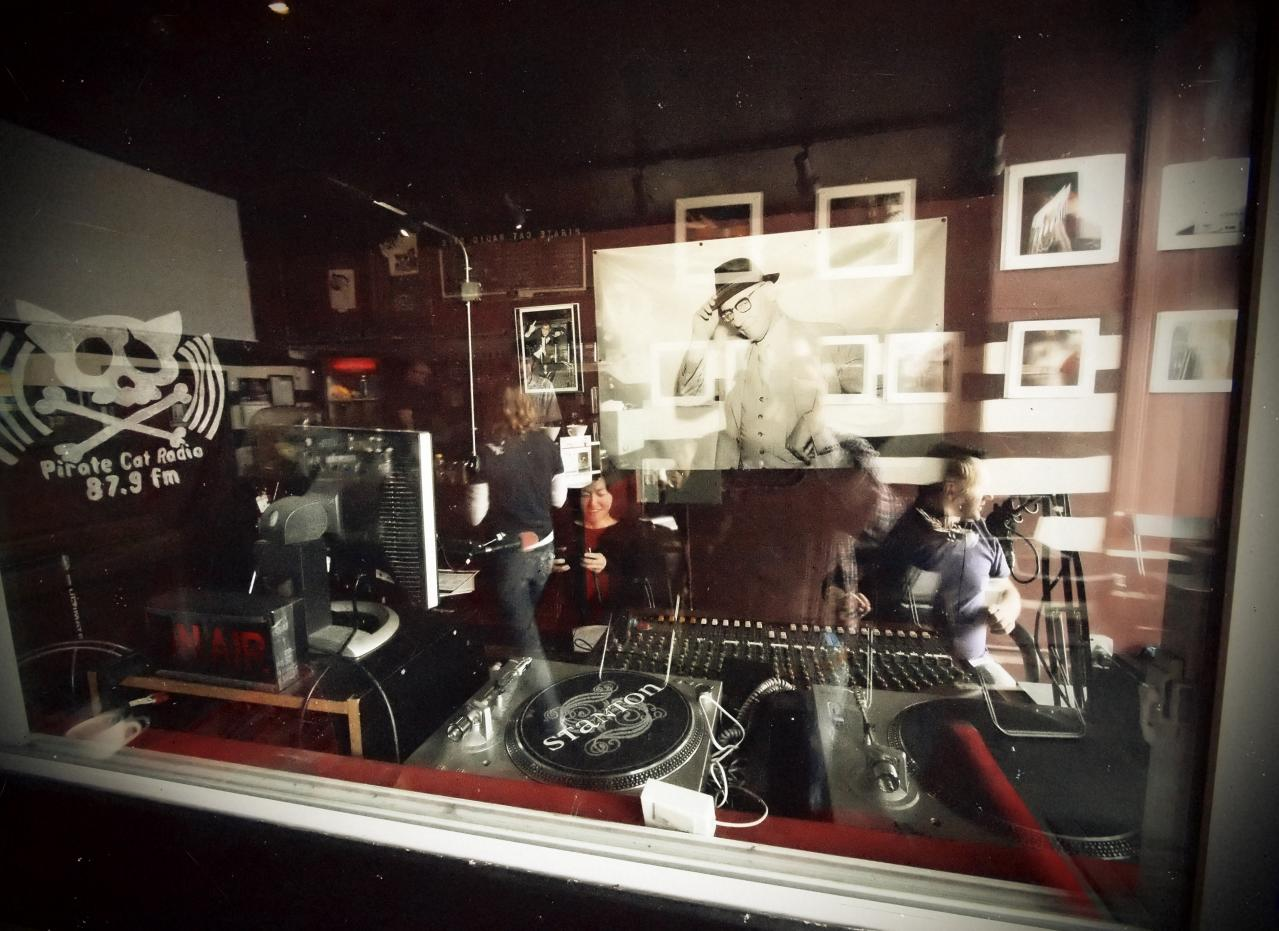

KPCR-LP: Los Gatos, California; KMRT-LP: Santa Cruz, California; United States
- Frequencies: KPCR-LP: 92.9 MHz; KMRT-LP: 101.9 MHz
- Branding: Pirate Cat Radio

Programming
- Language(s): English
- Format: Eclectic

Ownership
- Owner: KPCR-LP: Central Coast Media Education Foundation; KMRT-LP: Media Watch for Improving Women's Images in the Media

History
- First air date: KPCR-LP: July 6, 2015; KMRT-LP: 2024
- Former call signs: KPCR-LP: KYTH-LP (2014–2019)
- Former frequencies: KPCR-LP: 87.9 MHz (as a pirate)
- Call sign meaning: KPCR-LP: Pirate Cat Radio

Technical information
- Facility ID: KPCR-LP: 195593; KMRT-LP: 788328
- ERP: KPCR-LP: 100 watts; KMRT-LP: 100 watts
- Transmitter coordinates: KPCR-LP: 37°12′58.1″N 121°57′37.1″W; KMRT-LP: 37°2′34.3″N 121°57′58″W

Links
- Webcast: Listen live
- Website: kpcr.org

Pirate Cat Radio is a community radio station broadcasting in Los Gatos, and Santa Cruz, California, United States. It is broadcast by two low-power FM stations: KPCR-LP 92.9 in Los Gatos and KMRT-LP 101.9 in Santa Cruz. Pirate Cat Radio airs an eclectic radio format with local music and talk programs.

The station, founded by Daniel Roberts, originally broadcast from Roberts's bedroom in Los Gatos without a license and continued on an unlicensed basis in various forms until 2009, continuing online only until 2011. In 2019, Roberts acquired the license for what at the time was the youth-oriented low-power FM station KYTH-LP in Santa Cruz, which became KPCR-LP and was moved in 2023 to Los Gatos with a second license taking its place in Santa Cruz.

== As an unlicensed station ==
Pirate Cat Radio was on the air as early as 1998, when its founder Daniel Roberts—known on air as "Monkey Man"—was 17. It was one of several unlicensed pirate radio stations operating in the region at the time. The station's equipment was under his bed, while the antenna was located in a tree. Later, Pirate Cat Radio originated from somewhere on the San Francisco Peninsula on 87.9 MHz. Writing for the San Francisco Chronicle in 2003, James Sullivan referred to Pirate Cat Radio as "renegade, punk-rock-oriented". For a time, a pirate TV station operated as an adjunct to Pirate Cat Radio. Roberts regularly received cease-and-desist notices from the Federal Communications Commission (FCC) but contended that the War on Terror fulfilled a clause in broadcasting regulations allowing stations to operate without a license in times of national emergency or war. By 2007, Pirate Cat Radio was also broadcast on pirate radio transmitters in Los Angeles and Gerlach, Nevada. In addition to music, it aired international news from Al Jazeera and local community issues programs, with politicians such as San Francisco mayor Gavin Newsom as occasional guests.

In 2009, the FCC fined Roberts $10,000 for broadcasting without a license. Roberts left the Bay Area for a time to relaunch KPDO in Pescadero, the first time he would operate a legal radio station. The original Pirate Cat Radio, which continued as an internet station, closed on February 12, 2011, amid strained relations with staff. Roberts left for Europe, while former Pirate Cat personalities put a new internet station on the air as Mutiny Radio, which continued programming through the end of 2023 and operations through January 2024.

== Legal revival ==
In 2015, a new low-power FM radio station began broadcasting in Santa Cruz: KYTH-LP 101.9, owned by Media Watch. The station was intended to be run entirely by teenagers and young people. In 2019, the station changed call signs to KPCR-LP and was transferred to Central Coast Media Education Foundation. This coincided with Roberts securing control of the license. Amid the COVID-19 pandemic, Roberts revived Pirate Cat Radio as an online station in 2020. In December 2023, the KPCR-LP license was moved from Santa Cruz to Los Gatos on 92.9 MHz. The void created by the move of KPCR-LP was filled by the authorization of a new low-power FM station, KMRT-LP, in Santa Cruz in 2024.

== See also ==
- Pirate radio in North America
- Community radio
- Low-power broadcasting
