= KSDT Radio =

Coordinates: 32°52′30″N 117°14′21″W

KSDT
- La Jolla, California; United States
- Frequency: None — online only (formerly 98.3 MHz on campus)

Programming
- Format: Eclectic

Ownership
- Owner: University of California San Diego

History
- First air date: June 1968

Links
- Webcast: ksdt.persona.co
- Website: ksdtradio.com

KSDT is an online college radio station which refers to itself as "fiercely independent college radio". Its facilities are located on the campus of the University of California, San Diego in La Jolla.

KSDT is completely student-run and operated. Its community comprises staff members, DJs, interns, practice room members, and general fans. The station regularly conducts interviews and studio sessions with San Diego and Southern California artists, as well as hosts off-the-air concerts, open mics and poetry readings. It publishes a quarterly zine featuring pictures from recent events, music opinion pieces, and album reviews, as well as community art and poetry. It also is the flagship radio carrier of the UC San Diego Tritons athletic programs.

== Organization ==
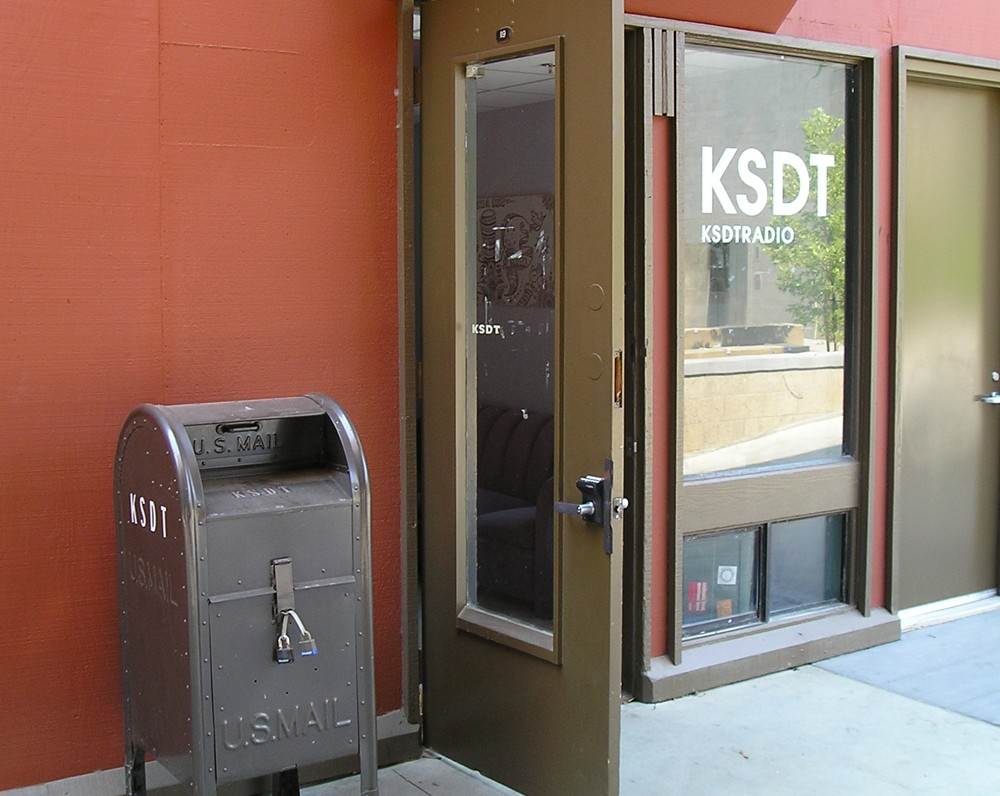
KSDT Radio in July 2008

KSDT is a student-run radio station. Its staff, consisting of a general manager, promotions director, two audio engineers, programming director, marketing director, music director, webmaster, secretary, media director, sports broadcasting director and design director, are all required by KSDT's charter to be students at UCSD. Each staff member is required to maintain an internship program, the largest of which being those for audio engineering and graphic design. Oversight is provided by the Associated Students (AS) and UCSD administration.

The majority of the organization's staff and budget is devoted to providing a public service to the surrounding communities by playing music and hosting programming not normally heard elsewhere; usually taking the form of music shows featuring independent and underground music from a variety of genres. While indie rock music and its many subgenres are consistently found being broadcast from KSDT, other genres such as jazz, blues, electronic music, ambient music, experimental, hip hop, world, and others can also be heard on-air. This is not indicative of any preference of music directors, but more on the makeup of its volunteer students DJs and the communities they represent. Alongside the Che Cafe, KSDT was a large part of the San Diego Punk and Hardcore Scene during the 1970s and 1980s.

KSDT does feature an open-door policy for accepting volunteer student DJs. Any UC San Diego student can apply to be accepted into a quarter-long DJ training process, consisting of hands-on training as well as volunteer work. If training is completed, shows are then created in the next quarter for an hour-long time slot during the week.

KSDT also has a recording studio, which runs under the responsibility of the audio engineers. It has mainly been used to record songs and demos for local acts and student musicians, as well as to teach for the audio engineering internship program.

Through the use of multiple online radio streams, KSDT broadcasts every UC San Diego basketball, baseball, softball, volleyball, soccer, and water polo home game, along with select road games. These broadcasts are presented under the branding of KSDT Sports.

== History ==
Founded in 1967, KSDT originally was a carrier current and FM cable radio station broadcasting on campus and to local cable TV subscribers. Throughout its history, KSDT has tried multiple times to obtain a terrestrial FM radio license but failed due to strict Federal Communications Commission (FCC) broadcasting laws and its proximity to Mexico, whose stations occupy much of the usual US educational band. It continued to pursue this goal in the 1990s and early 2000s, although has recently preferred being an online station.

As a public service college radio station, the format was largely musical, with some community access programming. Commercial-free, it received funding from the university.

In 1999 it moved to become an internet radio station. In 2000 and 2001, it split with its "sister station" SRTV (student-run television).

Its current mission statement in part "strives to promote independent music not available from other sources and works to help the San Diego Community as well."

The recording studio on its premises was used to record and broadcast live many independent bands such as aMiniature, Rookie Card, Skeletor, The Locust, Estradasphere, Dressy Bessy, The Robot Ate Me, Creedle, Sub Society, Milestone, etc.

Artists such as Lemmy from Motörhead, Björk, The Flaming Lips, The Meat Puppets, Screaming Trees, Mogwai, Fugazi, Madness and others have recorded station identifications for KSDT in the past.

== KSDT Sports ==
When UC San Diego began its transition to the Division I level of NCAA competition in 2020, KSDT began occasionally broadcasting live sporting events for UC San Diego athletics. For the 2023-24 school year, the station received funding to begin a formalized sports broadcasting program, complete with a director position and an internship. Through the founding of this program, KSDT's sports coverage grew to broadcasting every home game for NCAA sponsored team sports, a weekly sports show, and an independent social media presence for KSDT Sports.

With the 2024-25 NCAA season being the first in which UC San Diego could qualify for postseason competition, the brand of KSDT Sports became a significant storyline in relation to the Triton men's basketball team when the broadcasting program organized upwards of 300 students to drive up to UC Irvine as a part of an event known as "Operation Invade Irvine" to attend the Tritons road game on February 8th, a game with major ramifications for both the Tritons and Anteaters in their season-long battle to win the Big West Conference and qualify to March Madness. After the Tritons won in dominant fashion, the night of both the fan invasion and game itself was declared the greatest night in UC San Diego sporting history.

The Tritons would go on to win the Big West regular season in men's basketball and qualify for their first ever March Madness in both men's and women's basketball. Both March Madness debuts were broadcast by KSDT Sports, despite the games taking place during finals week of winter quarter. In the post-game press conference after the men's team was eliminated, Naismith Defensive Player of the Year finalist and star guard Hayden Gray credited KSDT Sports with having shifted the fan culture at UC San Diego.
