= AccuRadio =

Internet radio operator

- Type: Private
- Industry: Internet radio
- Founded: 2000
- Founder: Kurt Hanson
- Headquarters: Chicago, Illinois, United States
- Area served: Worldwide
- Services: Online music streaming
- Website: www.accuradio.com

AccuRadio (IPA: /ˌækjuːˈreɪdioʊ/) is an independent, multichannel Internet radio property founded in 2000, and based in Chicago, Illinois, US, available globally. It currently offers over a thousand pre-developed 'music channels'. Some channels also highlight music from different locations around the world.

The first three channels on Accuradio were "Swingin' Pop Standards", "Piano Jazz" and "Modern Rock Classics".

All of AccuRadio's audio channels (except those which are comedy-focused) provide continuous music streaming with talk limited to occasional commercials. While a song is playing, album cover, artist, song and album or mixtape information appears on screen. AccuRadio programmers select the music from the database available to them based on what they think is suitable.

In September 2014, NantWorks LLC, a company headed by Patrick Soon-Shiong, invested US$2.5 million into AccuRadio.

In May 2025, AccuRadio filed for Chapter 11 bankruptcy protection after facing a lawsuit from rights management organization SoundExchange, claiming that AccuRadio owes $200,000.

== Background ==
AccuRadio, based in Chicago, was founded by CEO Kurt Hanson, a University of Chicago alumnus who founded and continues to publish RAIN: Radio and Internet Newsletter from AccuRadio headquarters in the Loop. The Executive Vice President of Sales is Michael Damsky. Vice President of Technology is Arun Kambhammettu. John Gehron is Chief Operating Officer. The company also works with former broadcast radio personalities like Tommy Edwards, Barbara Prieto and Steve Cochran. In 2015, AccuRadio rebranded itself as "better radio for your workday" by adding 77 "workplace moods" channels to better target the 35-to-64 demographic of daytime office workers, and saw listener traffic jump nearly 35% in a single month.

== Features ==
A station is centralized by a specific genre or theme, or a combination of multiple items of any kind. Each track played can be rated on a scale from 1 to 5 stars, which determines its future airplay on all stations. If a listener has rated 4 or 5 stars for at least 20 tracks, a special 5-Star Radio channel is created, so that the listener can choose to listen to a melange of all those tracks at any time. However, other tracks from the same albums as the original selected track may also be included, and the listener does not have any choice about that. Accuradio refers to all tracks as 'songs', whether or not any singing is involved. Several genres have the "Listeners Top 100" station, an artist-specific station, a "HitKast" station playing current songs, or a year-specific station (the latter case is common for oldies). An artist or song can be banned on an individual station, but not overall. No response is applicable to musical attributes or to albums. Clicking the thumbs down or skipping feature is unlimited and will stop the current play of the track once either of them is used.

=== Streaming standards and quality ===
AccuRadio uses HE-AACv2 at 32 kbit/s for its audio streaming.

=== Web streaming ===
Based on the latest monthly report from Triton Digital's Webcast Metrics service in March 2018, AccuRadio is the ninth most-listened-to web streaming service among all U.S. broadcast groups that stream online, with 21,908 Average Active Sessions.

The service offers apps for iOS, Android, and webOS, all of which have been downloaded over half a million times and are highly rated at around 4.6 stars on the Apple, Android, and WebOS Nation app stores. A Roku app was previously available, but has been removed from the Roku app store with no explanation. In January 2013, AccuRadio partnered with Aha by HARMAN to makes its content available via Aha apps in an Aha-supported automobile dashboards.

=== Limits ===
Although skipping is unlimited, if too many skips are used in a day the user will be locked out for 24 hours. The same is true for listening for an extended period of time.

== Awards ==
AccuRadio won the People's Voice award for Best Radio in the 2006 Webby Awards, the AccuTunes interface built by AccuRadio won Best Radio again in 2008, and the AccuRadio IOS Handheld App was named an Honoree for the Best Streaming Audio category in the 2016 cycle.
