= MeeMix =

MeeMix Ltd
- Type: Private
- Industry: Telecommunications content services
- Founded: 2006
- Headquarters: Tel-Aviv, Israel
- Products: Personalized media recommendations, personalized media discovery, ad personalization
- Website: www.meemix.biz

MeeMix Ltd is a company specializing in personalizing media-related content recommendations, discovery and advertising for the telecommunication industry, founded in 2006.

On January 1, 2008, MeeMix launched meemix.com, a public personalized internet radio serving as an online testbed for the development of music taste-prediction technologies. Subsequently, MeeMix released in 2009 a line of Business-to-business commercial services intended to personalize media recommendations, discovery and advertising. MeeMix hybrid taste-prediction technology relies on integrating machine learning algorithms, digital signal processing, behavior analysis, metadata analysis and collaborative filtering, and is provided via API web service.

In August 2009, MeeMix was announced as Innovator Nominee in the GSM Association’s Mobile Innovation Grand Prix worldwide contest.

As of 2013, MeeMix no longer features internet radios on meemix.com. On Sep 28, 2014, meemix.com went offline.

== See also ==
- Behavioral targeting
- Collaborative filtering
- Internet radio
- Personalization
- Predictive analytics
