= Internet radio =

Digital audio service transmitted via the Internet

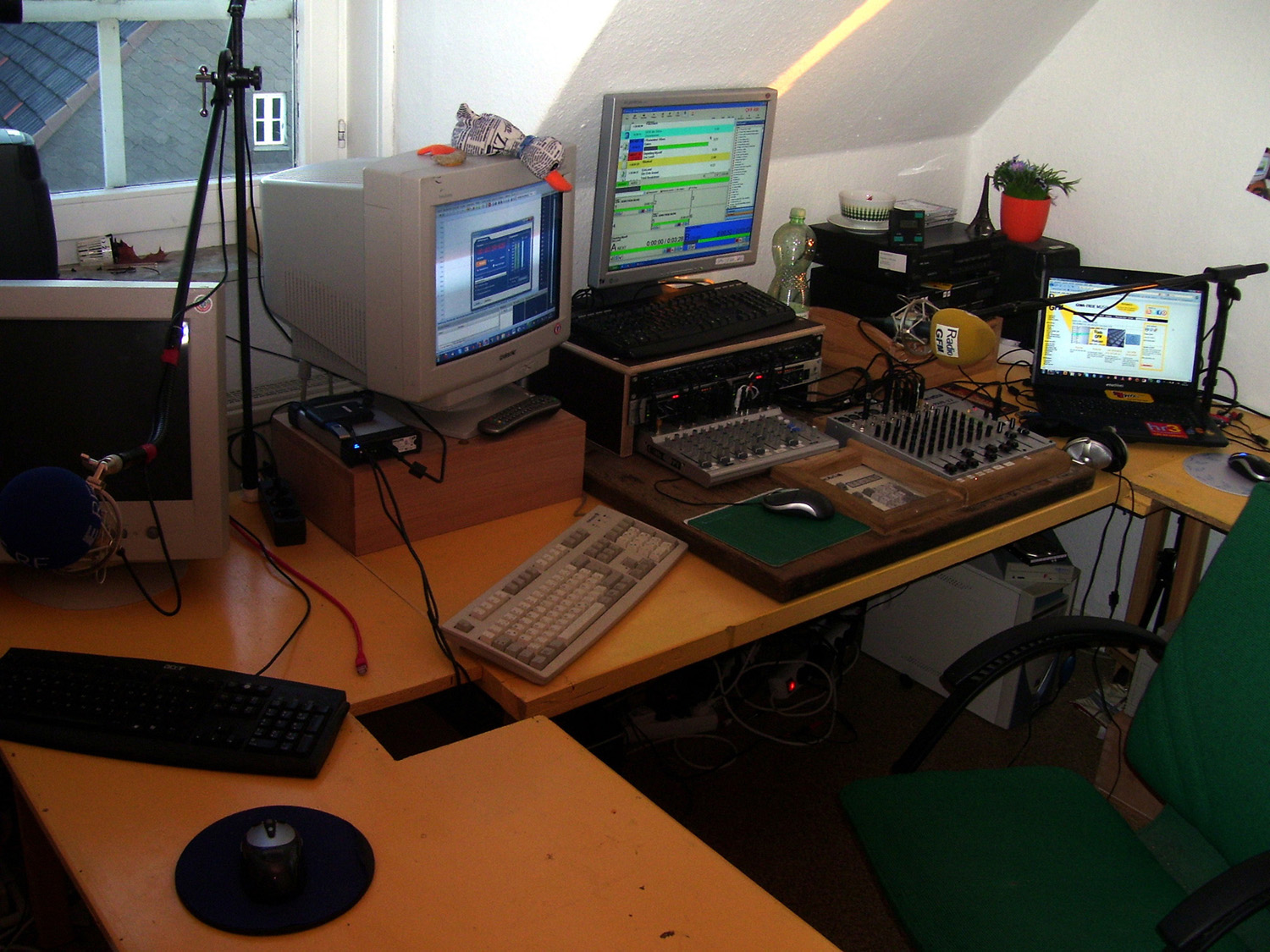
An Internet radio studio in 2010.

Internet radio, also known as online radio, web radio, net radio, streaming radio, e-radio and IP radio, is a digital audio service transmitted via the Internet. Broadcasting on the Internet is usually referred to as webcasting since it is not transmitted broadly through wireless means. It can either be used as a stand-alone device running through the Internet, or as a software running through a single computer.

Internet radio involves streaming media, presenting listeners with a continuous stream of audio that typically cannot be paused or replayed, much like traditional broadcast media; in this respect, it is distinct from on-demand file serving. Internet radio is also distinct from podcasting, which involves downloading rather than streaming.

Internet radio services offer news, sports, talk, and various genres of music—every format that is available on traditional broadcast radio stations. Many Internet radio services are associated with a corresponding traditional (terrestrial) radio station or radio network, although low start-up and ongoing costs have allowed a substantial proliferation of independent Internet-only radio stations.

The first Internet radio service was launched in 1993. As of 2017, the most popular Internet radio platforms and applications in the world include TuneIn Radio, iHeartRadio, and SiriusXM. In the U.S., unlike over-the-air broadcast radio, an FCC license is not required to operate an Internet radio service.

== Internet radio technology ==
Internet radio services are usually accessible from anywhere in the world with a suitable internet connection available; one could, for example, listen to an Australian station from Europe and America. This has made internet radio particularly suited to and popular among expatriate listeners. Nevertheless, some major networks like TuneIn Radio, Audacy, Pandora Radio, iHeartRadio and Citadel Broadcasting (except for news/talk and sports stations) in the United States, and Chrysalis in the United Kingdom, restrict listening to in-country due to music licensing and advertising issues.

Internet radio is also suited to listeners with special interests, allowing users to pick from a multitude of different stations and genres less commonly represented on traditional radio.

=== Listening ===
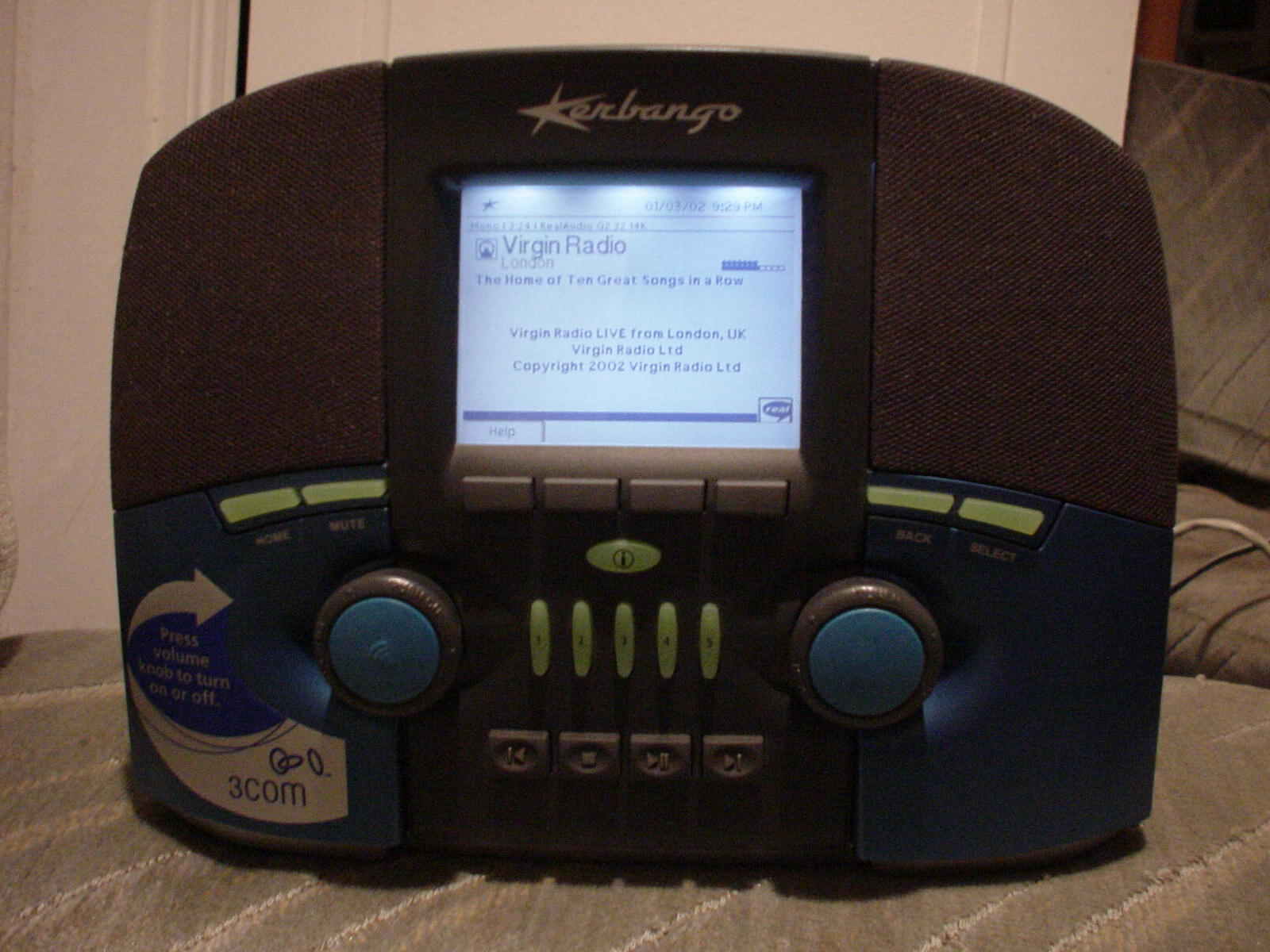
An early Kerbango Internet radio receiver

Internet radio is typically listened to on a standard home PC or similar device, through an embedded player program located on the respective station's website or on a smartphone app. In recent years, dedicated devices that resemble and offer the listener a similar experience to a traditional radio receiver have arrived on the market.

=== Streaming ===
Streaming technology is used to distribute Internet radio, typically using a lossy audio codec. Streaming audio formats include MP3, AAC+, Ogg Opus, Ogg Vorbis, Windows Media Audio, RealAudio. Audio data is continuously transmitted serially (streamed) over the local network or internet in TCP or UDP packets, then reassembled at the receiver and played a second or two later. The delay is called lag, and is introduced at several stages of digital audio broadcasting.

=== Simulation ===
A local tuner simulation program includes all the online radios that can also be heard in the air in the city.

== Popularity ==
In 2003, revenue from online streaming music radio was US$49 million. By 2006, that figure rose to US$500 million. A February 21, 2007 "survey of 3,000 Americans released by consultancy Bridge Ratings & Research" found that "[a]s much as 19% of U.S. consumers 12 and older listen to Web-based radio stations." In other words, there were "some 57 million weekly listeners of Internet radio programs. More people listen to online radio than to satellite radio, HD Radio, podcasts, or cell-phone-based radio combined." An April 2008 Arbitron survey showed that, in the US, more than one in seven persons aged 25–54 years old listen to online radio each week. In 2008, 13 percent of the American population listened to the radio online, compared to 11 percent in 2007. Internet radio functionality is also built into many dedicated Internet radio devices, which give an FM like receiver user experience.

In the fourth quarter (Q4) of 2012, Pandora, TuneIn Radio, iHeart Radio, and other subscription-based and free Internet radio services accounted for nearly one quarter (23 percent) of the average weekly music listening time among consumers between the ages of 13 and 35, an increase from a share of 17 percent the previous year.

As Internet-radio listening rose among the 13-to-35 age group, listening to AM/FM radio, which now accounts for 24 percent of music-listening time, declined 2 percentage points. In the 36-and-older age group, by contrast, Internet radio accounted for just 13 percent of music listening, while AM/FM radio dominated listening methods with a 41 percent share.

As of 2014, 47% of all Americans ages 12 and older—an estimated 124 million people—said they have listened to online radio in the last month, while 36% (94 million people) have listened in the last week. These figures are up from 45% and 33%, respectively, in 2013. The average amount of time spent listening increased from 11 hours, 56 minutes per week in 2013 to 13 hours 19 minutes in 2014. As might be expected, usage numbers are much higher for teens and younger adults, with 75% of Americans ages 12–24 listening to online radio in the last month, compared to 50% of Americans ages 25–54 and 21% of Americans 55+. The weekly figures for the same age groups were 64%, 37% and 13%, respectively. In 2015, it was recorded that 53% of Americans, or 143 million people, ages 12 and up currently listen to internet radio.

== Broadcasting freedoms ==
Some stations, such as Primordial Radio, use Internet radio as a platform as opposed to other means such as FM or DAB, as it gives greater freedom to broadcast as they see fit, without being subject to regulatory bodies such as Ofcom in the UK. For example, Ofcom has very strict rules about presenters endorsing products and product placement; being an Internet radio station they are free of this constraint. One of the large controversies regarding internet radio revolved around a dispute between regulators over the amount of royalties Internet radio stations had to pay out. The Copyright Royalty Board initially wanted internet radio stations to pay out 100% royalties to the musicians whose songs were played compared to the 15% that satellite radio stations had to pay. This disagreement was temporarily postponed when the webcaster act of 2008 and 2009 was passed.

== History ==
Internet radio was pioneered by Carl Malamud. In 1993, Malamud launched "Internet Talk Radio", which was the "first computer-radio talk show, each week interviewing a computer expert". The first Internet concert was broadcast on June 24, 1993, by the band Severe Tire Damage. In March 1994, an unofficial automated rebroadcast of Irish radio news was set up as the RTE To Everywhere Project, allowing Irish people across the world daily access to radio news from home until it was rendered obsolete in 1998. In November 1994, a Rolling Stones concert was the "first major cyberspace multicast concert." Mick Jagger opened the concert by saying, "I want to say a special welcome to everyone that's, uh, climbed into the Internet tonight and, uh, has got into the M-bone. And I hope it doesn't all collapse."

On November 7, 1994, WXYC (89.3 FM Chapel Hill, North Carolina, USA) became the first traditional radio station to announce broadcasting on the Internet. WXYC used an FM radio connected to a system at SunSite, later known as Ibiblio, running Cornell's CU-SeeMe software. WXYC had begun test broadcasts and bandwidth testing as early as August 1994. WREK (91.1 FM, Atlanta, GA USA) started streaming on the same day using their own custom software called CyberRadio1. However, unlike WXYC, this was WREK's beta launch and the stream was not advertised until a later date.

On December 3, 1994, KJHK 90.7 FM, a campus radio station located in Lawrence, Kansas, at the University of Kansas, became one of the first radio stations in the world to broadcast a live and continuous stream over Internet radio. Time magazine said that RealAudio took "advantage of the latest advances in digital compression" and delivered "AM radio-quality sound in so-called real time." Eventually, companies such as Nullsoft and Microsoft released streaming audio players as free downloads. As the software audio players became available, "many Web-based radio stations began springing up."

In 1995, Scott Bourne founded NetRadio.com as the world's first Internet-only radio network. NetRadio.com was a pioneer in Internet radio. It was the first Internet-only network to be licensed by ASCAP. NetRadio eventually went on to an IPO in October 1999. Most of the current Internet radio providers followed the path that NetRadio.com carved out in digital media. In mid December 1995, Vancouver-based AM radio station CKNW became the first commercial radio station in Canada to stream 24/7 over the internet. In March 1996, Virgin Radio – London became the first European radio station to broadcast its full program live on the Internet. It broadcast its FM signal, live from the source, simultaneously on the Internet 24 hours a day.

Highlander Internet Radio (HIR) was launched in December 1996 by Mark Monaghan, broadcasting from Strathpeffer, Scotland. The Scotsman described it at launch as "what is claimed to be Europe's first radio station on the Internet." Early programming included Sean Connery's independence speech recorded for the Scottish National Party and a Christmas message for Scottish descendants." By March 1997, HIR had become the first broadcaster in Britain to be officially licensed on the World Wide Web, receiving recognition from the Mechanical-Copyright Protection Society, the UK's official licensing body. Microsoft included the station in its Music Central listings, and HIR reported an international audience of 60,000. In January 1997 the station broadcast a Burns Night program, which drew an audience of nearly 50,000 listeners, among them the Moscow Caledonian Society.

On May 1, 1997, Radio306.com (now Pure Rock Radio) launched in Saskatoon, Canada. The internet-only station purerockradio.net celebrated 20 years on air in 2017 as the longest-running Canadian internet station. Purerockradio.net shut down on July 1, 2021, after 25 years of broadcast.

Internet radio also provided new opportunities to mix music with advocacy messages. In February 1999, Zero24-7 Web Radio was launched. It was the first Internet radio station to be crowdsourced and programmed by professional broadcasters and crowdfunded by a unique partnership of people, charities and businesses. Out of Washington DC, the station mixed progressive music and green messages. It was created by BBC and WHFS veteran Mark Daley.

Internet radio attracted significant media and investor attention in the late 1990s. In 1998, the initial public stock offering for Broadcast.com set a record at the time for the largest jump in price in stock offerings in the United States. The offering price was US$18 and the company's shares opened at US$68 on the first day of trading. The company was losing money at the time and indicated in a prospectus filed with the Securities Exchange Commission that they expected the losses to continue indefinitely. Yahoo! purchased Broadcast.com on July 20, 1999, for US$5.7 billion.

With the advent of streaming RealAudio over HTTP, streaming became more accessible to a number of radio shows. One such show, TechEdge Radio in 1997, was broadcast in three formats – live on the radio, live from a RealAudio server and streamed from the web over HTTP.

In 1998, the longest running internet radio show, The Vinyl Lounge, began netcasting from Sydney, Australia, from Australia's first Internet radio station, NetFM (www.netfm.net) NetFM was recognised by the Australian National Film and Sound Archive. In 1999, Australian telco "Telstra" launched The Basement Internet Radio Station but it was shut down in 2003 as it was not a viable business for the company.

From 2000 onwards, most Internet radio stations increased their stream quality as bandwidth became more economical. Today, most stations stream between 64 kbit/s and 128 kbit/s providing near CD quality audio. As of 2017 the mobile app Radio Garden, a research project of the Netherlands Institute for Sound and Vision, was streaming approximately 8,000 radio stations to a global audience.

=== US royalty controversy ===
In October 1998, the US Congress passed the Digital Millennium Copyright Act (DMCA), one result of which is that performance royalties are to be paid for satellite radio and Internet radio broadcasts in addition to publishing royalties. In contrast, traditional radio broadcasters pay only publishing royalties and no performance royalties.

A rancorous dispute ensued over how performance royalties should be assessed for Internet broadcasters. Some observers said that royalty rates that were being proposed were overly burdensome and intended to disadvantage independent Internet-only stations—that "while Internet giants like AOL may be able to afford the new rates, many smaller Internet radio stations will have to shut down." The Digital Media Association (DiMA) said that even large companies, like Yahoo! Music, might fail due to the proposed rates. Some observers said that some U.S.-based Internet broadcasts might be moved to foreign jurisdictions where US royalties do not apply.

Many of these critics organized SaveNetRadio.org, "a coalition of listeners, artists, labels and webcasters" that opposed the proposed royalty rates. To focus attention on the consequences of the impending rate hike, many US Internet broadcasters participated in a "Day of Silence" on June 26, 2007. On that day, they shut off their audio streams or streamed ambient sound, sometimes interspersed with brief public service announcements voiced, written and produced by popular voiceover artist Dave Solomon. Notable participants included Rhapsody, Live365, MTV, Pandora, Digitally Imported and SHOUTcast.

Some broadcasters did not participate, such as Last.fm, which had just been purchased for US$280 million by CBS Music Group. According to a Last.fm employee, they were unable to participate because participation "may compromise ongoing license negotiations."

SoundExchange, representing supporters of the increase in royalty rates, pointed out that the rates were flat from 1998 through 2005 (see above), without being increased to reflect cost-of-living increases. They also declared that if Internet radio is to build businesses from the product of recordings, the performers and owners of those recordings should receive fair compensation.

On May 1, 2007, SoundExchange came to an agreement with certain large webcasters regarding the minimum fees that were modified by the determination of the Copyright Royalty Board. While the CRB decision imposed a $500 per station or channel minimum fee for all webcasters, certain webcasters represented through DiMA negotiated a $50,000 "cap" on those fees with SoundExchange. However, DiMA and SoundExchange continue to negotiate over the per song, per listener fees.

SoundExchange has also offered alternative rates and terms to certain eligible small webcasters, that allow them to calculate their royalties as a percentage of their revenue or expenses, instead of at a per performance rate. To be eligible, a webcaster had to have revenues of less than US$1.25 million a year and stream less than 5 million "listener hours" a month (or an average of 6830 concurrent listeners). These restrictions would disqualify independent webcasters like AccuRadio, Digitally Imported, Club977 and others from participating in the offer, and therefore many small commercial webcasters continue to negotiate a settlement with SoundExchange.

An August 16, 2008 Washington Post article reported that although Pandora was "one of the nation's most popular Web radio services, with about 1 million listeners daily...the burgeoning company may be on the verge of collapse" due to the structuring of performance royalty payment for webcasters. "Traditional radio, by contrast, pays no such fee. Satellite radio pays a fee but at a less onerous rate, at least by some measures." The article indicated that "other Web radio outfits" may be "doomed" for the same reasons.

On September 30, 2008, the United States Congress passed "a bill that would put into effect any changes to the royalty rate to which [record labels and web casters] agree while lawmakers are out of session." Although royalty rates are expected to decrease, many webcasters nevertheless predict difficulties generating sufficient revenue to cover their royalty payments.

In January 2009, the US Copyright Royalty Board announced that "it will apply royalties to streaming net services based on revenue." Since then, websites like Pandora Radio, AccuRadio, Mog, 8tracks and Google Music changed the way people discover and listen to music.

The Webcaster Settlement Act of 2009 expired in January 2016, ending a 10-year period in which smaller online radio stations, Live365 among them, could pay reduced royalties to labels. On January 31, 2016, webcasters who are governed by rules adopted by the Copyright Royalty Board were required to pay to SoundExchange an annual, nonrefundable minimum fee of $500 for each channel and station, the fee for services with greater than 100 stations or channels being $50,000 annually.

== Growth of web radio vs FM radio ==
In 2025, internet radio (also known as web radio) has surpassed traditional FM radio in popularity in many markets, driven by technological advances, shifting consumer behavior, and widespread mobile and smart device adoption.

The format offers global accessibility, allowing users worldwide to stream stations outside of their geographic region and discover niche formats not available via FM. Internet radio also supports personalization, user‑curated stations, and on‑demand replay features, which traditional FM broadcasting does not offer.

Device integration has exponentially increased access to web radio: smartphones, smart speakers, connected cars, and smart TVs support streaming radio apps, reducing reliance on dedicated FM tuners.

According to Edison Research, in Q2 2025, AM/FM radio accounted for just over one‑third of total daily listening time among U.S. adults aged 13+, while combined digital audio formats (streamed music, podcasts, web radio, YouTube audio, satellite) exceeded 50% of listening usage.

A report by Commercial Radio & Audio and Edison Research found that online radio listening among Australian adults aged 25–54 nearly doubled from 2021 to 2024 — from 15% to 31% — primarily due to growing smartphone usage and app-based access.

As younger generations (Millennials and Gen Z) increasingly favor on‑demand, personalized streaming platforms, FM's appeal is diminishing. FM's fixed content and lack of interactivity make it less appealing to digital‑native users.

Furthermore, with the expansion of 5G and satellite-based internet, especially in vehicles and rural areas, web radio access continues to rise, further eroding FM's traditional dominance in mobile contexts.

== See also ==
- Comparison of streaming media software
- E-commerce
- Internet radio audience measurement
- Internet radio device
- Internet radio licensing
- Internet talk radio
- List of Internet radio stations
- List of campus radio stations
- List of college web-only stations in the U.S.
- List of streaming media systems
- Mbone, experimental "multicast backbone"
- Radio music ripping
- Radio over IP
- Radiobeta
- Simulcast
- TuneIn
