= Simfy =

Music subscription service, 2010–2015

SimfyMusic
- Key people: CEO: Alexander Herbst
- Launch date: 3 May 2010
- Platform(s): Web, BlackBerry, iPhone, Android, Adobe Air (for Windows, Mac OS, Linux)
- Pricing model: Subscription or Free (30sec. preview)
- Availability: Germany, Austria, Switzerland, and South Africa

Simfy Music was a music subscription service available in Germany, Austria, and Switzerland, It was available as a website and also had clients for iPhone, Android, and BlackBerry which can play streaming music or cache songs for offline playback. The web-based service also offered a cross-platform client based on Adobe Air. Its library had content from the four major record labels, as well as the Merlin Network and aggregators such as The Orchard, and Finetunes. Simfy also offered social networking, allowing users to share playlists and follow others to see what music they listen to. In June 2014, MTN partnered with Simfy for streaming music.

On 1 May 2015, Simfy changed its music catalog. The official website now only shows a message, that Simfy continues to only offer a "limited number of songs" and redirects all users to Deezer. According to Bundesanzeiger, the company is in liquidation since April 2015.

Simfy Africa continued to operate and was brought by MTN Group in 2018.

== Similar organizations ==
- Deezer
- Grooveshark
- Jango
- Last.fm
- MOG
- Qobuz
- rara.com
- Rdio
- Rhapsody
- simfy africa
- Spinlet
- Spotify
- WIMP (music streaming service)
- Xbox Music
- MyMusic.com.ng
