= David Heymann =

David Heymann may refer to:

- David Heymann (architect), American architect
- David L. Heymann (born 1946), American epidemiologist
- David Heymann Joël, German rabbi

== See also ==
- David Hayman (disambiguation)
- David Heyman (disambiguation)
- David Hyman, American entrepreneur
