= IMM =

IMM or imm may refer to:

== In companies, institutions, and organizations ==
- IMM Graduate School of Marketing, South Africa
- Industries Mécaniques Maghrébines, a Tunisian and Algerian manufacturer of Isuzu vehicles
- Institut für Mikrotechnik Mainz (Mainz Institute of Microtechnology)
- Institute of Molecular Medicine (disambiguation)
- Instituto de Medicina Molecular (University of Lisbon Institute of Molecular Medicine)
- Institution of Mining and Metallurgy, a former British research institution
- International Mercantile Marine Co., a shipping trust in the early twentieth century
- Institut for Marketing Management, at Zurich University of Applied Sciences/ZHAW

== In events ==
- imm Cologne, international furniture trade fair

== In places ==
- IMM (Singapore), shopping mall in Singapore

== In science and technology ==
- Inner mitochondrial membrane
- Immortal (MUD), an administrator or developer on a MUD
- Interacting multiple model (IMM), an estimator used in radar tracking
- Injection molding machine
- Integrated Management Module, an IBM remote system management technology

== In other uses ==
- Indianmeal Moth (Plodia interpunctella)
- International Monetary Market, a unit of the Chicago Mercantile Exchange

== Sustainable development ==
- Integrated Modification Methodology
