= Wowloud =

Defunct online music streaming service in Malaysia

- Launch date: December 2011; 14 years ago
- Discontinued: 1 June 2014
- Platform(s): PC, iOS, Android, BlackBerry, Mac OS X, Windows
- Pricing model: Subscription
- Availability: Malaysia
- Website: www.wowloud.com
- CEO: Chung Jaan Hao

Wowloud was the first online music streaming service in Malaysia operating by MNC Wireless Bhd. It is available on PC, Smart TVs and also on iPhone, iPod Touch and iPad, Android and BlackBerry. Its library has content from the Universal Music Malaysia, Warner Music Malaysia, Sony Music Entertainment Malaysia and One Stop Music. Currently, there are three categories of Wowloud account such as Wowloud Free, Wowloud Premium and the Wowloud Premium Plus. In July 2012, Wowloud launched audio hardware webstore.

As of 1 June 2014, the service has ceased to exist.

== Features ==
The Discovery Radio feature allowed users to select and recommend music tracks to users based on their music history.

== Similar organisations ==
- Deezer
- MOG
- rara.com
- Rhapsody
- Spotify
