= David Heymann (architect) =

American architect (born 1959)

David Heymann FAIA
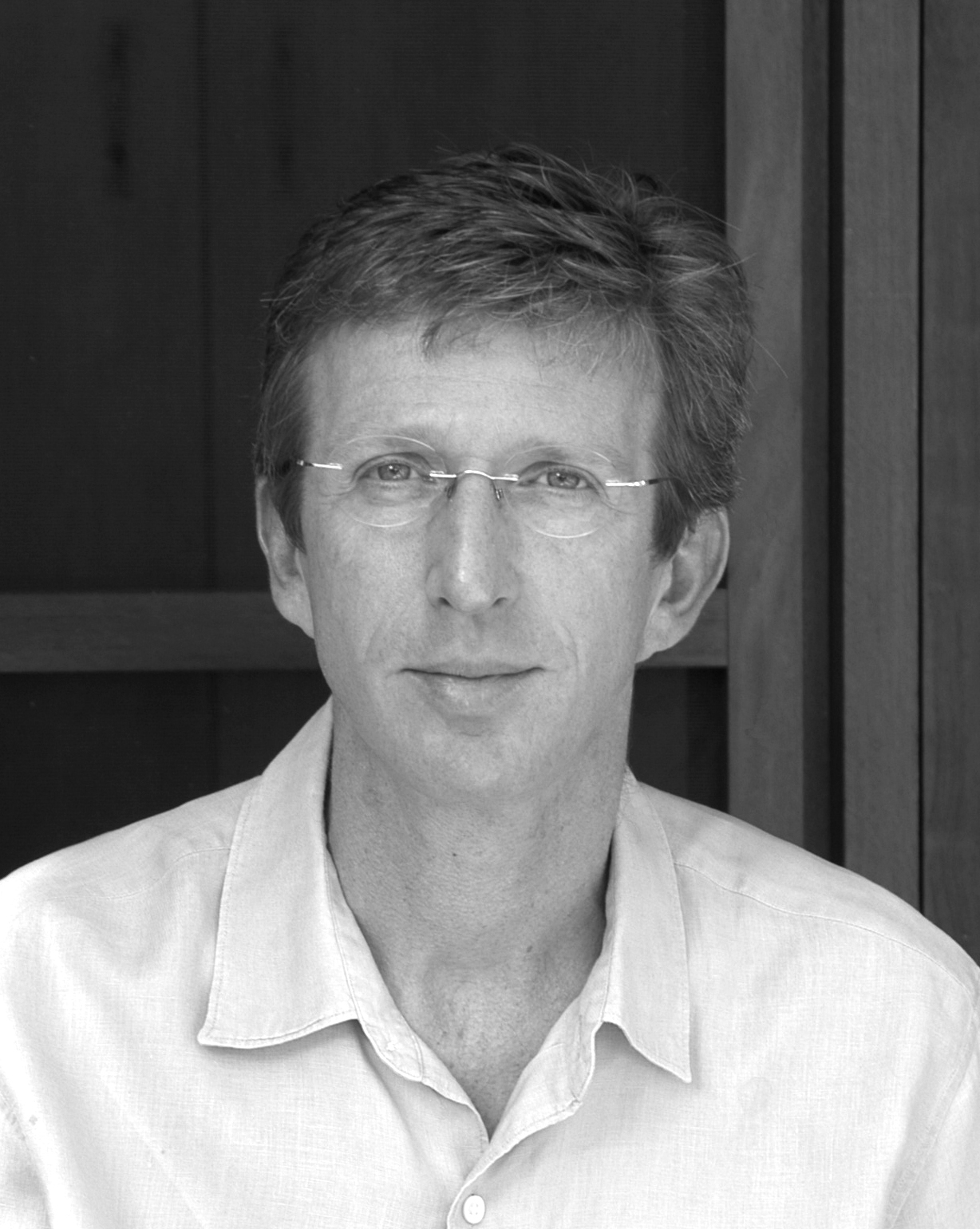
- Heymann in 2007
- Born: 1959 (age 66–67)
- Education: Cooper Union; Harvard Graduate School of Design
- Occupations: Architect, Professor
- Years active: 1984 — Present
- Employer: University of Texas at Austin School of Architecture
- Known for: Architecture
- Notable work: Prairie Chapel Ranch near Crawford, Texas, Audubon Society visitor center
- Movement: Green
- Spouse: Sandra Fiedorek
- Children: 2
- Awards: PA Award citation, Progressive Architecture; Award for Outstanding Educational Contributions, Texas Society of Architects; Bradford Williams Medal, American Society of Landscape Architects
- Website: soa.utexas.edu/faculty/david-heymann

David Heymann (born 1959) is an American architect, writer, and educator. He is most known for his design of an environmentally friendly house for then–Governor of Texas, George W. Bush, and Laura Bush for their Prairie Chapel Ranch near Crawford, Texas. Heymann studied architecture at the undergraduate level at Cooper Union, before obtaining a Master of Architecture Degree from the Graduate School of Design at Harvard University. He taught at Iowa State University, before becoming a professor at the University of Texas at Austin School of Architecture.

He focused on green architecture and sustainable design, and devoted his writing to the interplay between landscapes and buildings. He contributed regular articles to publications including Places Journal, and published a fictionalized book of short stories titled My Beautiful City Austin. His second book, John S. Chase – The Chase Residence, was about architect John S. Chase.

His design of the property for the Bush family began in 1999, and featured an eye for environmental sustainability. George Bush gave him directives for simplicity and utilitarianism for hosting guests at the property, while Laura Bush wanted to avoid pretentiousness and desired for the property to be seamless with its surrounding landscape. Laura Bush invited Heymann back to the property again, after the end of her husband's presidency, to design an art studio for the former president.

Heymann's architectural works were featured in publications including Architectural Record and Architectural Digest. He garnered a PA Award citation from Progressive Architecture magazine in 1994, the Award for Outstanding Educational Contributions from the Texas Society of Architects in 2002, and a Bradford Williams Medal from the American Society of Landscape Architects in 2012.

== Early life and education ==
Born in 1959, (Note: Aged 55 as of 14 December 2014 (b.1958/1959), aged 60 as of 3 November 2020 (b.1959/1960); overlap is 1959) Heymann received his Bachelor of Architecture degree from The Cooper Union in 1984. Heymann received his Master of Architecture Degree from the Graduate School of Design at Harvard University in 1988.

== Architecture projects ==
=== Design firms and American Institute Fellow ===
He worked for the architects Tod Williams and Associates (now Tod Williams Billie Tsien Architects), and I.M. Pei and Partners, utilizing his undergraduate degree in architecture, before going on for his master's degree. After graduating with his master's degree, he began an architectural firm together with Michael Underhill and subsequently including Laura Miller, which garnered honors for their designs. For their work on behalf of Ontario Bible Church (now Oakwood Bible Church), Heymann, Underhill, and Miller were awarded a PA Design Citation from Progressive Architecture magazine in 1994. The trio collaborated on design for two churches together in Ames, Iowa. In 2000, Heymann was selected by the Architectural League of New York for inclusion in its Emerging Voices series.

Heymann was known to specialize in environmentally friendly architectural design. The Audubon Society referred to Heymann as a "well-known 'green' architect". Heymann's architecture has been published in journals including Architecture, Architectural Record, Architectural Digest, Metropolis, Progressive Architecture, and Texas Architect.

In 2014, he was elevated to the designation, Fellow of the American Institute of Architects, the professional organization for architects in America. Heymann has been a Visiting Artist / Scholar / Fellow at the American Academy in Rome, the Dora Maar House through the Museum of Fine Arts Houston, the Rockefeller Foundation at Bellagio, and the Bogliasco Foundation Liguria Study Center. He has been a resident artist in photography at the MacDowell Colony, the Ucross Foundation, and with the Arctic Circle Program.

=== Prairie Chapel Ranch ===
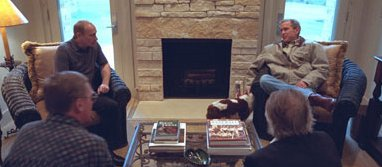
Bush and Vladimir Putin by a limestone fireplace at the Prairie Chapel Ranch (2001)

Deedie Rose, a Dallas arts and architecture patron, recommended Heymann to George W. Bush and Laura Bush to design the new house for their Prairie Chapel Ranch. The property later served as their home away from the White House when Bush became president, during which time it was referred to as the Western White House. Interior design was supervised by Kenneth Blasingame Design, with Michael Williams overseeing external landscaping of the property. Heymann designed three adjacent, single-level buildings, all clad in honey-colored native limestone: a three-bedroom house, a two-suite guest house, and a garage building. Heymann sited the buildings and a swimming pool "into an almost imperceptible rise amid an existing grove of live oaks and cedar elms."

Heymann started initial conversations with the Bush couple about the design project, in August 1999. George Bush's directives to Heymann were simple in nature, and included relaxing chairs, an effective shower, and a king-sized bed. He wanted somewhere he could entertain guests and enter and exit the property easily. Heymann explained the president's requests, "He wanted it to be very relaxed. The way he described it he wanted a house for people to come over, sit on the couch and eat hamburgers and beans with their shoes off." Heymann worked closely with Laura Bush throughout the creation of the property. Heymann said she had posed a cautionary question to him, throughout the design process, "Is it pretentious?" Heymann said his goal for the design of the property was, "quiet and neutral, casual, extremely small, low-key, and absent of pretension, intended to blend in with nature." During the design process, Heymann would outline potential layouts on the ground so the Bushes could visualize how the house would work in each setting. Heymann worked closely on the design with Laura Bush. "She has a lot of experience from seeing the carefully organized houses that her dad built, and she has a very, very good eye." Laura Bush stated, "One thing we wanted was to make sure the house fit into the landscape." She observed, "I think it does, with the low house and the native limestone that looks very natural. It also takes advantage of the landscape with all the views."

View of windows at Prairie Chapel Ranch (2001)

The buildings were designed using strategies to achieve environmental sustainability. Combined, the three buildings amount to less than 4,000 square feet (370 m^{2}) of interior space. They are positioned using basic passive solar principles, absorbing winter sunlight, while being shaded in summer. A 10-foot (3.0 m)-wide porch encircles the main house, which in plan is "a narrow rectangle broken into an arc." The design takes maximum advantage of the breeze by being long and narrow – most of the house is only one room wide.

Heymann selected limestone quarried very close to the site. He explained, "They cut the top and bottom of it off because nobody really wants it." He noted they were able to acquire materials cheaply, "So we bought all this throwaway stone. It's fabulous. It's got great color and it is relatively inexpensive." The buildings use geothermal energy to heat and cool, and require less energy for that purpose. A 42,000-US-gallon (160,000 L; 35,000 imp gal) underground cistern collects rainwater gathered from the roof. Wastewater from sinks, toilets, and showers is also funneled into the cistern after being purified in underground tanks. The water from the cistern is then used to irrigate the landscaping around the buildings.

The encircling porch provides a seamless transition from indoors to outdoors. Most movement between rooms goes via the porch, and most of the windows of the house are full height doors that open onto it. When the doors are all open the house "becomes a veritable pavilion." Heymann said, "it’s a very simple idea: Outside is cold or warm, you’re in the sun or the shade or the wind, or you’re not, but that’s something you trust. The sensation is real. And direct." Laura Bush noted, "It's slightly motel-ish, but we love that." She pointed out that there were no stairs or thresholds, explaining their ethos, "We wanted our older parents to feel comfortable here. We also want to grow old here ourselves."

After the conclusion of Bush's second term in-office as president, his wife reached back out to Heymann to add an addition of an art studio on the property. In 2017, Heymann completed the construction of a painting studio adjacent to the main house. The studio gets its daylight from a north–south facing light monitor in the roof, with a lighting system designed to provide continuously balanced daylight-colored light. The studio's north storage wall rolls into pockets, allowing the studio to be opened to the outdoors.

== Writing and teaching career ==
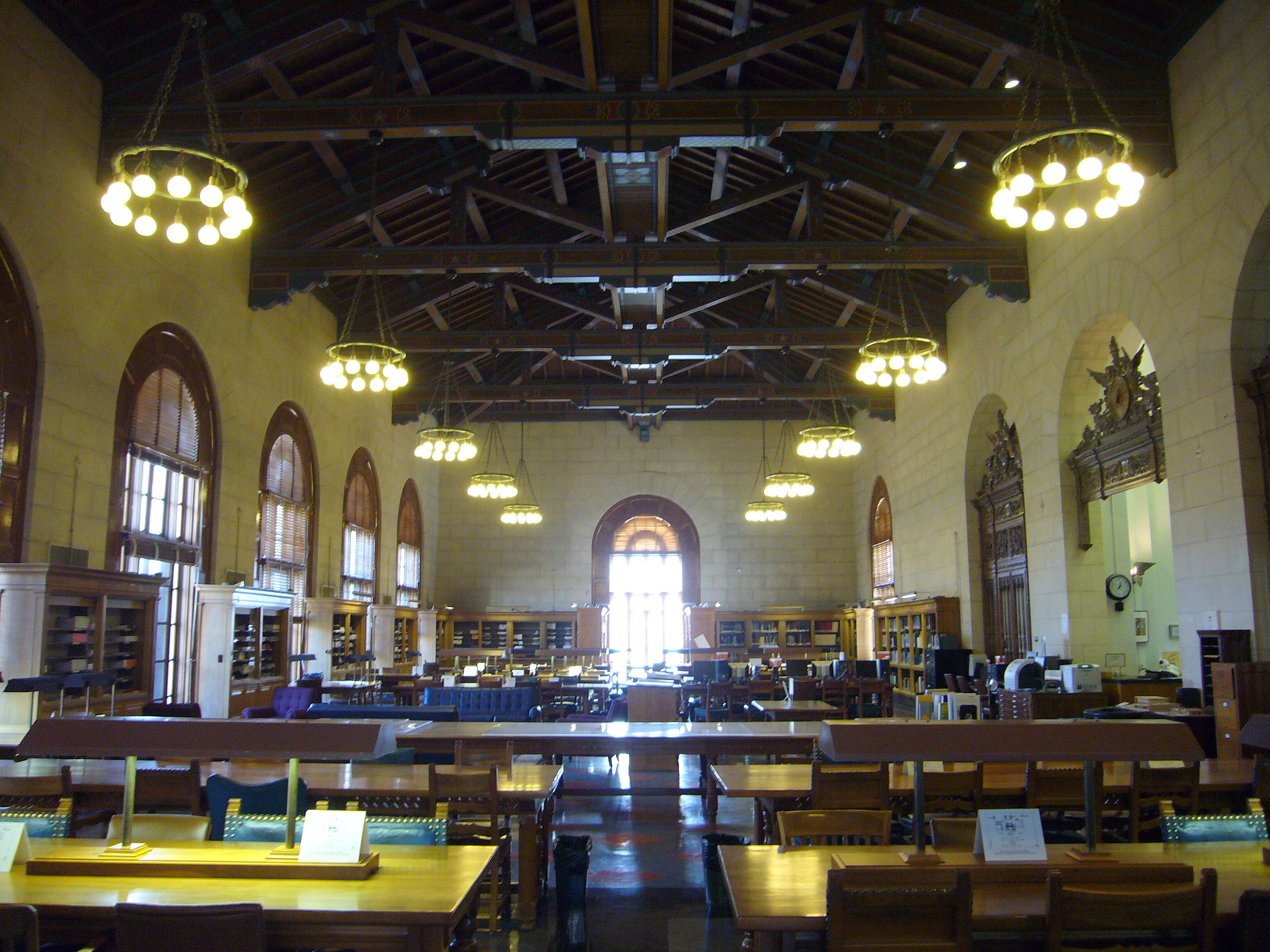
David Heymann is the Harwell Hamilton Harris Regents Professor at the University of Texas at Austin School of Architecture (library pictured)

Heymann was an instructor at Iowa State University in 1988. Heymann's writing has explored the interactions between landscapes and buildings. He also made the same topic a focus of his lecture course at the college level, entitled, Site Design. He garnered the 2002 Award for Outstanding Educational Contributions from the Texas Society of Architects. Heymann was awarded the 17th annual Friar Centennial Teaching Fellowship (FCTF) in 2003. Its honorarium is the largest for undergraduate teaching excellence at The University of Texas. In 2006, Heymann was the associate dean of architecture at the University of Texas at Austin. He garnered the 2009 University of Texas Regents Outstanding Teaching Award. He was selected for inclusion, in Design Intelligence's 25 Most Admired Educators in 2017 and 2018. Heymann additionally received The Texas Exes Award for Teaching Excellence. As of 2026, he is the Harwell Hamilton Harris Regents Professor at University of Texas at Austin School of Architecture. In 2026, he was scholar-in-residence at the Burns House in Los Angeles, California. Heymann is a University of Texas Academy of Distinguished Teaching Professor, and an Association of Collegiate Schools of Architecture Distinguished Professor.

Heymann is a contributing writer for Places Journal. His Places Journal essay serires, "Landscape is Our Sex", was awarded the 2012 Bradford Williams Medal from the American Society of Landscape Architects. In 2014 he published his first book, a collection of short stories, titled My Beautiful City Austin. The book further fleshed out essays he had contributed for Places Journal between the period of 2010 through 2013. When Heymann first moved to Austin, Texas, he felt the city was the subject of too much constructive and development. He initially started the book as a scholarly paper on why Austin was being overbuilt, but he found his own writing style about the topic in a non-fiction format to be boring. In order to reach a wider audience, he instead shifted the work to be in a fictional format.

With co-author Rice University lecturer Stephen Fox, he published the book John S. Chase–The Chase Residence in 2020. The book is about John S. Chase, the first Black person to become a licensed architect in the state of Texas. The work goes into depth specifically on Chase's residence itself, a house with a modern style, and a courtyard inside the facility open to the atmosphere, with a dedicated koi pond. Heymann emphasized Chase's importance in mentoring and honing the skills of other Black architects in his field.

== Personal life and family ==
Heymann lives in Austin, Texas with his wife, Sandra Fiedorek. They have two children together. Fiedorek is an artist, and she collaborated together with Heymann on the creation of a participatory art gallery in 1998 in Austin, Texas, called, "Material World". The same year, they worked together to create the exhibit, "56", at the Howson Branch Library in Austin. The couple shared a home art studio together.

== Awards and recognition ==
Awards and recognition received by David Heymann
Year	Award	Organization	Work	Result	Ref.
1994	PA Award Citation	Progressive Architecture magazine	Ontario Bible Church (now Oakwood Bible Church)	Won	
2000	Emerging Voices series	Architectural League of New York	Body of architectural work	Selected	
2002	Award for Outstanding Educational Contributions	Texas Society of Architects	Teaching work	Won	
2003	Friar Centennial Teaching Fellowship	Friar Society, University of Texas at Austin	Teaching work	Won	
2008	ACSA Distinguished Professor Award	Association of Collegiate Schools of Architecture	Teaching work	Won	
2009	Regents' Outstanding Teaching Award	University of Texas at Austin	Teaching work	Won	
2012	Bradford Williams Medal	American Society of Landscape Architects	"Landscape is Our Sex", Places Journal	Won	
2014	Fellow of the American Institute of Architects	American Institute of Architects	Body of architectural work	Selected	
2015	Sustainability Showdown Award	University of Texas at Austin	Presentation, Sustainability	Won	
2017	25 Most Admired Educators	Design Intelligence	Teaching work	Selected	
2018	25 Most Admired Educators	Design Intelligence	Teaching work	Selected	

== Bibliography ==
=== Books ===
- Heymann, David (2014), My Beautiful City Austin, John M. Hardy Press, ISBN 978-0990371403
- Heymann, David; Fox, Stephen (2020), John S. Chase - The Chase Residence, Tower Books, ISBN 978-0934951326

=== Articles ===
- Heymann, David (July 7, 1999), "Why We Work at the Big Table", The Cornell Journal of Architecture, Graduated Practices (6)
- Heymann, David (November 2010), "A Cloud on a Lake", Places Journal, Landscape is Our Sex
- Heymann, David (December 2010), "Nature-ization Takes Command", Places Journal, Landscape is Our Sex
- Heymann, David (December 2010), "Site, Ascendant", Places Journal, Landscape is Our Sex
- Heymann, David (July 2011), "The Eastward-Moving House", Places Journal
- Heymann, David (November 2011), "Landscape is Our Sex", Places Journal, Landscape is Our Sex
- Heymann, David (December 2011), "A Mound in the Wood", Places Journal, Landscape is Our Sex
- Heymann, David (December 2011), "The Evil, Evil Grain Elevator", Places Journal, Landscape is Our Sex
- Heymann, David (June 2012), "An Un-flushable Urinal – The aesthetic potential of sustainability", Places Journal
- Heymann, David (January 2013), "My Beautiful City – No one in Texas thinks of Austin as a real city, and as a city it is in truth a model of nothing.", Places Journal
- Heymann, David (May 2013), "Please Save Modernism from the Modern – The Folk Art Museum is a great modernist building, and MoMA should reverse its decision to tear it down.", Places Journal
- Heymann, David (January 2014), "A Life in Ruins", Places Journal
- Heymann, David (December 2014), "Tracks – A Walk in the Arctic", Places Journal
- Heymann, David (February 2015), "A Building, Not a Colt Revolver", Places Journal, Landscape is Our Sex
- Heymann, David (January 1, 2016), "Defining the territories of landscape practice: Towards the Neo infrastructural", Kerb: Journal of Landscape Architecture (24), Irrigation Australia Limited: 40–45, ISSN 1324-8049
- Heymann, David (June 2016), "Trouble with Terminators - Why not make buildings today as they once were made? This is actually a really good, really radical question.", Places Journal, Landscape is Our Sex
- Heymann, David (September 2017), "The Ugly Pet – Sustainability should be revolutionary to architectural form. But it hasn't been, at least not yet.", Places Journal
- Heymann, David (2019), "Net Zero", Log (46): 113–119
- Heymann, David (July 2019), "Landscape Will Thank You to Remember That", Places Journal, Landscape is Our Sex
- Heymann, David (April 2020), "Field Notes on Pandemic Teaching: 2", Places Journal
- Heymann, David (March 12, 2021), "Model Home – In 1959, John S. Chase, Texas's first licensed Black architect, laid claim to one of the state's most radical houses", The Architect's Newspaper
- Heymann, David (November 1, 2021), "Book Review: Couples Therapy", Texas Architect, vol. 72, no. 6
- Heymann, David (November 2022), "Field Notes on Design Activism: 3", Places Journal
- Heymann, David (May 22, 2024), "Material Manifesto – Greg Esparza pushes the ecological envelope with Cross Cabin in Austin", The Architect's Newspaper
- Heymann, David (December 2024), "Bookshelf: Fall 2024", Places Journal
- Heymann, David (April 21, 2025), "Jealous as Hell – At Rice University, Karamuk Kuo's new Cannady Hall serves as an extension of the school's architecture building", The Architect's Newspaper
- Heymann, David (December 17, 2025), "Shade is the Luxury", Texas Architect, vol. 75, no. 5

== See also ==
- Architecture of the United States
- Design for the environment
- Design impact measures
- Ecological design
- List of architects
- List of American architects
- Sustainable design
- Sustainable engineering
