= MusicStation =

Music service platform developed by Omnifone

- Launched: 14 June 2007
- Discontinued: 2011
- Platforms: Mobile, web, PC, Blu-ray players, PS3 games console, PSP portable games console, home cinema systems, Walkman digital audio players, S1 and S2 tablets, in-home, in-car
- Availability: US; Canada; UK; Ireland; Australia; New Zealand; France; Germany; Italy; Spain; Austria; Belgium; Netherlands; Luxembourg; Sweden; Norway; Denmark; Finland; Switzerland; Croatia; Hungary; Singapore; Hong Kong; Taiwan; South Africa; Brazil; Mexico
- Website: www.omnifone.com

MusicStation is a music service platform developed by Omnifone. The cloud based platform works across a number of different digital device platforms and is tailored specifically for various partners including rara.com, RIM, Sony, Sony Ericsson, HP, BSkyB, Vodafone, Telenor, Hutchison Telecom and Vodacom.

== Services ==
In February 2009 Omnifone introduced MusicStation Next Generation, a white label unlimited music audio and video download and streaming solution for Internet service providers (ISPs) and consumer electronics device vendors. The cloud based solution offers interoperable music on a wide range of connected devices, including home entertainment systems, gaming consoles, and car audio systems.

In April 2009 Hutchison Telecom became the first Omnifone partner to introduce MusicStation Desktop Edition to users in Hong Kong on its 3 network.

Omnifone's MusicStation was the first subscription based unlimited music download service available on mobiles in the UK launching with Vodafone in November 2007.

In June 2008, Omnifone announced that MusicStation had become the largest subscription based unlimited music download service in the UK within seven months of launching on Vodafone.

== History ==
- 14 January 2003: British Entrepreneurs Rob Lewis, Phil Sant and Mark Knight form Omnifone
- 12 February 2007: Omnifone announces MusicStation
- 14 June 2007: MusicStation goes live with its first rollout in Sweden with Telenor
- 22 October 2007: MusicStation launches in Hong Kong with 3
- 1 November 2007: MusicStation launches in South Africa with Vodacom
- 1 November 2007: MusicStation launches in the UK with Vodafone
- 12 February 2008: Omnifone launches MusicStation Max, a pre-licensed unlimited music phone development programme with LG signed up as a handset manufacturer
- 15 September 2008: MusicStation launches in New Zealand with Vodafone
- 22 September 2008: MusicStation launches in Australia with Vodafone
- 24 September 2008: Omnifone announces partnership with Sony Ericsson to power PlayNow plus, its pre-licensed unlimited downloads service across Walkman mobiles
- 14 November 2008: Sony Ericsson launches PlayNow plus in Sweden with Telenor
- 8 January 2009: Omnifone announces partnership with Gracenote to bring unlimited music to multiple device platforms
- 12 January 2009: Omnifone powered in-car entertainment system CarStars wins CNET 'Best of CES' Car Tech award at the 2009 International Consumer Electronic Show in Las Vegas; the largest consumer electronics event in the world
- 16 February 2009: Omnifone announces MusicStation Next Generation unlimited music service for ISPs to fight piracy online, confirming reports that it is in discussions with BSkyB as its first ISP customer
- 13 March 2009: Sony Ericsson launches PlayNow plus in Switzerland with Swisscom
- 2 April 2009: MusicStation Desktop Edition launches in Hong Kong
- 23 April 2009: Sony Ericsson launches PlayNow plus in Singapore with Singtel
- 9 June 2009: Sony Ericsson launches PlayNow plus in Austria with Orange
- 8 September 2009: Sony Ericsson launches PlayNow plus in the Netherlands with T-Mobile
- 14 October 2009: Sony Ericsson launches PlayNow plus in Hungary with T-Mobile
- 19 October 2009: BSkyB launches Sky Songs streaming and downloads service in the UK
- 23 October 2009: Sony Ericsson launches PlayNow plus in Brazil with Vivo
- 9 November 2009: Sony Ericsson launches PlayNow plus in Mexico with Telcel
- 20 November 2009: Sony Ericsson launches PlayNow plus in Croatia with T-Mobile
- 21 November 2009: Sony Ericsson launches PlayNow plus in Singapore with M1
- 8 January 2010: Omnifone extends relationship with Gracenote, allows for cloud-based music solutions in more than 30 countries in 2010
- 25 January 2010: Omnifone announces partnership with HP for MusicStation on PCs in 10 countries across Europe
- 15 February 2010: Omnifone announces MusicStation for Android
- 16 February 2010: Omnifone first to encode its global music catalogue into Dolby Pulse file format for cloud based digital music services in 2010
- 22 December 2010: Sony launches Q Music Unlimited cloud music service powered by Omnifone in the UK and Ireland
- 22 January 2011: Sony launches Q Music Unlimited cloud music service powered by Omnifone in France, Germany, Italy and Spain
- 17 February 2011: Sony launches Q Music Unlimited cloud music service powered by Omnifone in the US, Australia and New Zealand
- 25 August 2011: RIM launches BBM Music social music service in beta – powered by Omnifone in the US, Canada and the UK
- 13 December 2011: rara.com launches across Europe and the USA – powered by Omnifone
- 14 December 2011: rara.com launches across New Zealand – powered by Omnifone

== See also ==
- Omnifone
- Rob Lewis
- Sony Ericsson PlayNow plus
