= IM2 =

IM2, IM.2, IM 2. IM-2, may refer to:

- IM2 (strain), the type strain for the archaebacterium Pyrobaculum aerophilum
- Bristol Pegasus IM.2, a British aero engine, a variant of the Bristol Mercury
- Douglas, Isle of Man (Royal Mail postcode IM2)
- Institute of Medicine 2 (IM-2), Rangoon, Burma; former name of University of Medicine 2, Yangon, Myanmar
- Interactive Multimodal Information Management (IM2), a project at the Idiap Research Institute
- Intermediate 2 (IM2), a rowing competition class under British Rowing
- Interstellar meteor 2 (IM2; CNEOS 2017-03-09), a 2017 meteor of interstellar origin, the second such discovered
- Intuitive Machines IM-2 "Athena", a U.S. commercial lunar lander space mission, part of the NASA CLPS program

== See also ==
- Iron Man 2, a 2010 superhero film
- IM (disambiguation)
- IMM (disambiguation)
- lM2
