= David Heyman (disambiguation) =

David Heyman (born 1961) is an English film producer.

David Heyman may also refer to:

- David M. Heyman (1891–1984), American financier, health services leader, philanthropist, and art collector

== See also ==
- David Hayman (disambiguation)
- David Heymann (disambiguation)
- David Hyman, American entrepreneur
