= Addicted to Noise =

Former American online music magazine

- Addicted to Noise Issue 3.10, October 1997
- Editor: Michael Goldberg
- Founder: Michael Goldberg; Jon Luini
- First issue: December 1, 1994; 31 years ago
- Final issue: July 3, 2000; 26 years ago
- Company: TCI Music (1997–1999); Viacom (1999–2000)
- Website: addict.com (Archived URL)

Addicted to Noise (ATN) was an American online music magazine in the early days of the World Wide Web. Founded in 1994 by ex-Rolling Stone associate editor and senior writer Michael Goldberg and online music pioneer Jon Luini, it published its first issue on December 1, 1994 and was the first online magazine to include audio samples alongside new album reviews. It published its final issue on July 3, 2000.

Among the many artists interviewed for ATN were R.E.M., Neil Young, Patti Smith, Sonic Youth, Chris Isaak, Eminem, Green Day, Metallica, American Music Club, Tom Waits, Paul Westerberg, Lou Reed, David Lowery of Cracker/Camper Van Beethoven, Sleater-Kinney and Prince. The distinctive logo – originally a coat of arms using two syringes, but later changed so it featured two guitars – was designed by artist Frank Kozik, who regularly contributed graphics to the magazine. ATN's daily "Music News of the World" quickly became a source of music news used by MTV, numerous radio stations throughout the world, and many print publications including the NME and Melody Maker.

Goldberg enlisted a who's who of music critics to write for ATN including Dave Marsh, Mark Brown, Greil Marcus, Richard Meltzer, Ed Ward, Billy Altman, Deborah Frost, Bud Scoppa, Roy Trakin, Chris Morris, and others. Music and literary stars including Joey Ramone, William Gibson, Was (Not Was) co-leader David Was, Patti Smith Group guitarist Lenny Kaye, and Sleater-Kinney's Corin Tucker wrote guest columns or reviews.

== Acquisition ==
In 1997, ATN and SonicNet were both acquired by Paradigm Music Entertainment, which in turn was acquired by TCI Music which was then acquired by Viacom in 1999 and folded into MTV's online operation, MTVi. Goldberg became a Senior Vice-President at SonicNet where he was also Editor in Chief of both SonicNet and Addicted To Noise until June 2000. He went on to found a music and culture blog, Days of the Crazy-Wild and is a columnist for the Australian Addicted to Noise. Luini remains in the digital media business, and serves as the president and founder of Chime Interactive, a digital media consulting agency, among other ventures. Former Director of Ad Sales, David Hyman, went on to found MOG.

In 2008, MTV started a short-lived online venture using the same domain name.
