= David Hayman (disambiguation) =

David Hayman (born 1948) is a Scottish film, television and stage actor and director.

David Hayman may also refer to:

- David Hayman (disease ecologist), New Zealand-based epizootic epidemiologist and disease ecologist

== See also ==
- David Heyman (disambiguation)
- David Heymann (disambiguation)
- David Hyman, American entrepreneur
