= Omnifone =

UK-based streaming music service (2003–2016)

- Type: Limited
- Industry: Digital music services
- Founded: 14 January 2003
- Founder: Rob Lewis, Phil Sant, Mark Knight
- Defunct: 4 May 2016
- Headquarters: London, United Kingdom
- Area served: US; Canada; UK; Ireland; Australia; New Zealand; France; Germany; Italy; Spain; Austria; The Netherlands; Belgium; Luxembourg; Sweden; Norway; Finland; Denmark; Switzerland; Croatia; Hungary; Singapore; Hong Kong; Taiwan; South Africa; Brazil; Mexico; Japan
- Key people: Rob Lewis (Executive Chairman), Jeff Hughes (CEO)
- Products: Sony Music Unlimited, RIM BBM Music, MusicStation, Sony Ericsson PlayNow plus, rara.com
- Number of employees: 200 people
- Website: www.omnifone.com

Omnifone was a UK-based company that was an independent provider of cloud-based unlimited music services to consumer electronics vendors, mobile carriers, Internet service providers and consumer brands including RIM, Sony, HP, and rara.com.

Omnifone enabled legitimate cloud-based unlimited music consumption and a viable alternative to piracy across multiple in-home, in-car, mobile and PC platforms, having launched its MusicStation-powered unlimited music services across five continents on a wide range of devices.

On 4 May 2016 the company was placed into administration, laying off a substantial part of its staff and looking for a buyer, whereupon the company ceased its operations. Some of its assets have been acquired by Apple.

== Licensing ==
Omnifone operated licensed music services in 34 markets for its customers, which included Sony Music Unlimited, Guvera, SiriusXM and rara.com.

In June 2007 Omnifone secured the first international licensing agreements for unlimited music services with all four major music labels; Universal Music Group, Sony Music Entertainment, Warner Music Group and EMI Music.

In January 2011 Omnifone secured Germany's first global subscription licensing with GEMA. In July 2012 Omnifone licensed and launched Sony Entertainment Network's Music Unlimited service in Japan, the region's ever first global music subscription service.

== Services ==
MusicStation was Omnifone's multi-award-winning unlimited music service platform. The cloud-based technology platform worked across a wide range of different digital device types and was tailored specifically for each market, platform and partner. Omnifone provided a number of different variants of MusicStation:

Omnifone's Desktop applications enabled consumers to stream, download, play and share music, direct to their desktop computer. The service was provided in partnership with personal computer vendors, mobile carrier networks, and broadband providers. MusicStation Desktop Edition provided a personalised user experience, which featured play-based music recommendations, connected community services and features, and an automatic back-up of private and public playlists to the cloud, plus online search and discovery capabilities. The service was able to synchronise with all other MusicStation-powered services and mobile devices via the cloud. In April 2009 Hutchison Telecom became the first Omnifone partner to introduce MusicStation Desktop Edition to users in Hong Kong on its 3 network provided 'in concert' with MusicStation Mobile Edition providing unlimited access to music across mobile and PC. In January 2010 MusicStation launched across Europe on HP desktop and laptop PCs in the UK, France, Germany, Italy, Spain, Austria, Belgium, Sweden, Switzerland and the Netherlands.

Omnifone provided a range of white label and co-branded mobile apps for all major mobile platforms including Android, iOS, Symbian, Windows Mobile and Java. Omnifone partnered with mobile carriers and handset manufacturers to deliver mobile app based services which give consumers the ability to stream, download, play and share unlimited amounts of music, direct-to-mobile. MusicStation was pre-installed by partner carriers or downloaded for free from carrier portals such as Vodafone Live!. Omnifone rolled out mobile apps with partners across five continents with Vodafone UK, Australia and New Zealand, Telenor Sweden, 3 Hong Kong, Vodacom South Africa.

== Funding ==
Omnifone was privately funded by the company's founders Rob Lewis, Phil Sant and Mark Knight with additional funding from diversified alternative investment firm Sofaer Capital.

== Partnership with Gracenote ==
Omnifone announced a partnership with Gracenote in January 2009 to bring interoperable cloud based unlimited music services to multiple device platforms including in-car, in-home, PC and mobile devices. A demonstration of the Omnifone/Gracenote technology won a Best of CES award at the Consumer Electronics Show in January 2009 followed a year later by an announcement at CES 2010 that Omnifone had introduced digital music services with Gracenote technology in 20 countries in 2009.

== History ==
UK entrepreneurs Rob Lewis, Phil Sant and Mark Knight established Omnifone in January 2003 after more than seven years working together in the internet space founding software development company Cromwell Media (sold to InterX for £850m in 2000) and IT industry news site Silicon.com (sold to NASDAQ-listed CNET Networks, part of CBS in 2001). The trio founded Omnifone to enable the next generation of digital content services to be delivered globally. The company spent four years developing its unlimited music service platform before announcing MusicStation in February 2007.

- 14 January 2003: British Entrepreneurs Rob Lewis, Phil Sant and Mark Knight form Omnifone
- 12 February 2007: Omnifone announces MusicStation
- 14 June 2007: MusicStation goes live with its first rollout in Sweden with Telenor
- 22 October 2007: MusicStation launches in Hong Kong with 3
- 1 November 2007: MusicStation launches in South Africa with Vodacom
- 1 November 2007: MusicStation launches in the UK with Vodafone
- 12 February 2008: Omnifone launches MusicStation Max, a pre-licensed unlimited music phone development programme with LG signed up as a handset manufacturer
- 15 September 2008: MusicStation launches in New Zealand with Vodafone
- 22 September 2008: MusicStation launches in Australia with Vodafone
- 24 September 2008: Omnifone announces partnership with Sony Ericsson to power PlayNow plus, its pre-licensed unlimited downloads service across Walkman mobiles
- 14 November 2008: Sony Ericsson launches PlayNow plus in Sweden with Telenor
- 8 January 2009: Omnifone announces partnership with Gracenote to bring unlimited music to multiple device platforms
- 12 January 2009: Omnifone powered in-car entertainment system CarStars wins CNET 'Best of CES' Car Tech award at the 2009 International Consumer Electronic Show in Las Vegas; the largest consumer electronics event in the world
- 16 February 2009: Omnifone announces MusicStation Next Generation unlimited music service for ISPs to fight piracy online, confirming reports that it is in discussions with BSkyB as its first ISP customer
- 13 March 2009: Sony Ericsson launches PlayNow plus in Switzerland with Swisscom
- 2 April 2009: MusicStation Desktop Edition launches in Hong Kong
- 23 April 2009: Sony Ericsson launches PlayNow plus in Singapore with Singtel
- 9 June 2009: Sony Ericsson launches PlayNow plus in Austria with Orange
- 8 September 2009: Sony Ericsson launches PlayNow plus in The Netherlands with T-Mobile
- 14 October 2009: Sony Ericsson launches PlayNow plus in Hungary with T-Mobile
- 19 October 2009: BSkyB launches Sky Songs streaming and downloads service in the UK
- 23 October 2009: Sony Ericsson launches PlayNow plus in Brazil with Vivo
- 9 November 2009: Sony Ericsson launches PlayNow plus in Mexico with Telcel
- 20 November 2009: Sony Ericsson launches PlayNow plus in Croatia with T-Mobile
- 21 November 2009: Sony Ericsson launches PlayNow plus in Singapore with M1
- 8 January 2010: Omnifone extends relationship with Gracenote, allows for cloud-based music solutions in more than 30 countries in 2010
- 25 January 2010: Omnifone announces partnership with HP for MusicStation on PCs in 10 countries across Europe
- 15 February 2010: Omnifone announces MusicStation for Android
- 16 February 2010: Omnifone first to encode its global music catalogue into Dolby Pulse file format for cloud based digital music services in 2010
- 16 April 2010: Omnifone appoints Jeff Hughes as CEO
- 22 December 2010: Sony launches Q Music Unlimited cloud music service powered by Omnifone in the UK and Ireland
- 22 January 2011: Sony launches Q Music Unlimited cloud music service powered by Omnifone in France, Germany, Italy and Spain
- 17 February 2011: Sony launches Q Music Unlimited cloud music service powered by Omnifone in the US, Australia and New Zealand
- 25 August 2011: RIM launches BBM Music social music service in beta – powered by Omnifone in the US, Canada and the UK
- 13 December 2011: rara.com launches across Europe and the USA – powered by Omnifone
- 14 December 2011: rara.com launches across New Zealand – powered by Omnifone
- 4 May 2016: Omnifone Group Ltd and Omifone Ltd placed in Administration (bankruptcy)
- 7 November 2016: Apple hired 16 employees and purchased select technology from Omnifone, player in streaming music services.

== Locations ==
Omnifone was headquartered in Brook Green, London, with offices in Asia Pacific and the US.
