= Rob Lewis (entrepreneur) =

English technology businessman and publisher (born 1969)

- Born: 23 May 1969 (age 57); London, United Kingdom
- Occupation: Founder CEO ROXi

Rob Lewis (born 23 May 1969) is an English businessman and serial entrepreneur. Lewis has established several publishing and technology ventures including Business & Technology magazine, Cromwell Media, Silicon Media Group, Omnifone, rara.com and most recently ROXi.

== Biography ==
Lewis was educated at Latymer Upper School, London. He gained a MA degree in Economics from Jesus College, Cambridge.

== Career ==
=== Journalism and publishing ===
Lewis established his first venture, the Cambridge Weekly Review, as a rival publication to Varsity, whilst reading Economics at Jesus College Cambridge. He sold the publication to Associate Publishing prior to taking his finals.

Lewis returned to publishing after two years in politics, founding and editing Business & Technology magazine, which he sold to Dennis Publishing in 1993; the publication was absorbed as part of Computer Weekly.

=== Politics ===
Lewis spent two years after Cambridge as a researcher and economic advisor to Huddersfield Labour MP Barry Sheerman in the run-up to the 1992 general election.

=== Internet ventures ===
In 1994, Lewis co-founded internet software company Cromwell Media with Phil Sant and Mark Knight, providing scalable enterprise-level software for insurance sites including MORE TH>N. While developing Cromwell Media in the years that followed, a chance meeting at a London party with a team of scientists from CERN in 1998 convinced Lewis of the power of IT publishing over the internet. Lewis founded Silicon Media Group with Eve-Marie Sant and Roger Knight the same year, launching IT news site Silicon.com in the UK, and sister sites Silicon.fr in Paris and Munich-based Silicon.de. In November 1999, Lewis reportedly raised over £11m in investment for Silicon.com from a consortium of venture capital firms headed by Amadeus Capital Partners, with reports valuing the company at £800m in May 2000.

By the time he was 30, The Guardian reported Lewis as one of the top six most successful young entrepreneurs in the UK. That same month, May 2000, aided by the ex-CEO of the Hoskyns Group (now Capgemini) Jim Feeney, Lewis sold Cromwell Media to InterX for £850m. Lewis went on to sell Silicon Media Group to NASDAQ-listed CNET Networks (part of CBS) in 2002.

=== Renewable energy ===
Lewis is an investor in Wind Energy, a renewable energy company dedicated to the sensitive development of on-shore wind farms, assessing potential sites across Scotland since 2002. Lewis brokered a majority stake sale to US-based power and utilities company AES Corporation in 2007, pairing Wind Energy with AES owned SeaWest Wind Power bringing a host of development skills to Wind Energy and accelerating the development of clean renewable energy for the UK. Wind Energy currently has nine wind farms in development, including North Rhins in Southern Scotland where permission was granted for 11 Vestas V80 turbines with a capacity of 22 megawatts of electricity. The wind farm will meet the annual electricity needs of around 15,000 homes, over a fifth of the households in Dumfries & Galloway.

=== Omnifone ===
Lewis founded Omnifone in January 2003 to enable the next generation of digital content services to be delivered globally. The company developed cloud based interoperable unlimited music services for consumer electronics vendors, mobile carriers and internet service providers across multiple in-home, in-car, mobile and PC device platforms.

Lewis secured the first international licensing for unlimited music services with all four major music labels in June 2007 rolling out the company’s multi-award-winning MusicStation powered unlimited music services to millions of device users across four continents with the likes of Sony, HP, BSkyB, Sony Ericsson, Vodafone, Telenor, Hutchison Telecom and Vodacom.

Omnifone failed and was placed into administration in May, 2016.

=== rara.com ===
Lewis also served as Chairman of streaming music service rara.com, launched across the US and Europe on 13 December 2011 on web and Android smartphones. The direct to consumer service was powered by Omnifone's MusicStation platform and was also licensed by the music service provider.

=== ROXi ===
Lewis founded ROXi in 2014 after he tried to buy his parents a music streaming system for Christmas. "...I would have to provide technical support - that was the light-bulb moment." The thought of constant queries about how to use a complex system was not attractive, so he set about creating something much simpler. "I set the team a challenge. Can we make something that comes in a box, affordable for most people, open the box, and two minutes later you've got a jukebox with all the world's music." ROXi announced the Electric Jukebox digital media player on 14 October 2015. Electric Jukebox was discontinued and succeeded by ROXi, a television based music entertainment experience with music streaming, radio, karaoke, music games, sound machine and visuals in August 2017. ROXi is available on pay TV and Smart TV platforms and via the ROXi Music System digital media player. Lewis brokered a partnership with Sky to bring ROXi to millions of homes on Sky Q in September 2020.

Lewis raised over £11.6m ($15m) for ROXi by September, 2020, with early backing from former Take That member Robbie Williams, Grammy award-winning artist Sheryl Crow, Britain’s Got Talent judge, singer and presenter Alesha Dixon, and actor, writer and comedian Stephen Fry. Lewis also received investment for ROXi from former Formula One and McLaren Group executive Ron Dennis who took a 10% stake in the company alongside investors such as Henrik Holmark the former CFO of jewellery chain Pandora Henrik Holmark, and Saracens rugby club owner Nigel Wray, the former manager of Irish rock band U2 Paul McGuinness and TomTom co-founder Mark Gretton who invested in the company.

=== Political campaigning ===
Lewis was the original author of the Entrepreneurs' letter, an open letter published on the front page of The Times newspaper in the final week of the 2010 general election campaign and signed by leading UK entrepreneurs.

The letter, also featured in The Daily Telegraph, warned of the dangers of a Labour/Liberal Democrat coalition government, and its potential effects on entrepreneurial business activity in the UK.

The letter was eventually signed by over 110 UK entrepreneurs, including Simon Calver, CEO of LoveFilm, Ben Goldsmith partner at WHEB Ventures Limited and Julie Meyer CEO of Ariadne Capital and online dragon for BBC Dragons' Den, and was covered extensively in the media, leading on the front page of The Sunday Times, and in The Sunday Express, The Sunday Mirror, The Guardian, the UK Press Association, Sky News and ITN four days before the election.

The letter stated that "under Labour the UK is becoming hostile territory for entrepreneurial businesses" and urged the public to vote for the Conservative Party.

Lewis also authored an open letter which was sent to every Conservative and Liberal Democrat MP on 21 June 2010 warning of the economic dangers of significantly increasing Capital Gains Tax in the UK, stating that "any blanket increase in CGT could have a significant long-term detrimental effect on entrepreneurial activity in the UK."

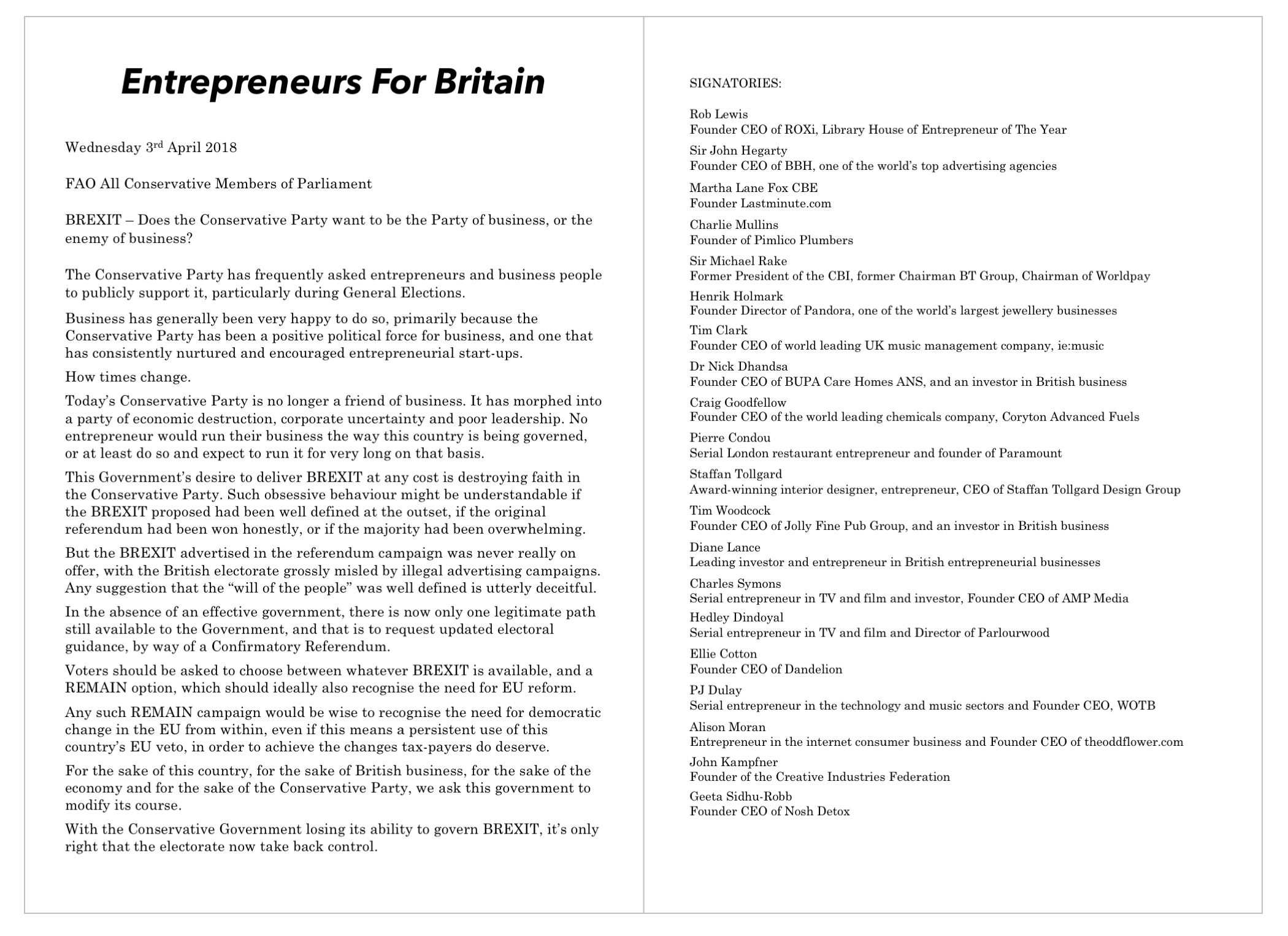
Entrepreneurs letter to Conservative MPs warning that British business is losing faith in the Conservative Party and its ability to manage BREXIT, and demanding a Confirmatory Referendum.

The letter was signed by over 110 leading UK entrepreneurs and was covered across a broad range of national UK media in the run up to the June 2010 United Kingdom Budget including the front page of The Guardian, The Financial Times, The Daily Telegraph, The Daily Express, BBC News, and The Scotsman. Following the publication of the letter the Chancellor announced that the standard rate of CGT would increase much less than expected, to 28% with the additional benefit of a substantially increased £5m entrepreneur relief.

On 3 April 2019 Lewis authored a letter to Conservative MPs warning that British business was losing faith in the Conservative Party and its ability to manage BREXIT, and demanding a Confirmatory Referendum or People's Vote. Lewis' letter was co-signed by 19 other leading British entrepreneurs including Lastminute.com founder and House of Lords Crossbench Peer Martha Lane Fox CBE, Sir John Hegarty, founder of global ad firm BBH, and Sir Michael Rake, former president of the CBI. The letter was featured in a number of UK national news outlets including the Evening Standard, Sky News, The i and City A.M. In the letter Rob Lewis and the other signatories told MPs: "Today’s Conservative party is no longer a friend of business. It has morphed into a party of economic destruction, corporate uncertainty and poor leadership… This government’s desire to deliver Brexit at any cost is destroying faith in the Conservative party… In the absence of an effective government, there is now only one legitimate path still available to the government, and that is to request updated electoral guidance, by way of a confirmatory referendum."

=== Members clubs ===
Lewis was a director and investor in Century Club, one of many private members clubs in London, and Paramount, the highest restaurant in Soho, perched at the summit of the Centre Point building.
