= Integrated modification methodology =

Analysis of urban settlements

Integrated modification methodology (IMM) is a procedure encompassing an open set of scientific techniques for morphologically analyzing the built environment in a multiscale manner and evaluating its performance in actual states or under specific design scenarios.

The methodology is structured around a nonlinear phasing process aiming for delivering a systemic understanding of any given urban settlement, formulating the modification set-ups for improving its performance, and examining the modification strategies to transform that system. The basic assumption in IMM is the recognition of the built environment as a Complex Adaptive System.

IMM has been developed by IMMdesignlab, a research lab based at Politecnico di Milano at the Department of Architecture, Built Environment and Construction Engineering (DABC).

== History ==
IMM began in 2010 as an academic research at Politecnico di Milano. That research criticized the analytical approach frequently used to study and evaluate the built environment by most of the sustainable development methods. By Recognizing the built environment as a Complex Adaptive System (CAS), IMM is urged towards a holistic simulation rather than simplifying the complex mechanisms within the cities with reductionism.

In 2013, Massimo Tadi established the IMMdesignlab at the Department of Architecture, Built Environment and Construction Engineering (DABC) of the Politecnico di Milano. The purpose of the mentioned laboratory is to develop IMM through research and education.

IN 2015, Integrated Modification Methodology for the Sustainable Built Environment has been approved as an academic course in the curriculum of the Architectural Engineering, an International Master Program in Politecnico di Milano.

== Background ==
At its theoretical background, Integrated Modification Methodology refers to the contemporary urban development as a highly paradoxical context arisen from the social and economic significance of the cities on the one hand and their arguably negative environmental impacts on the other. Asserting the inevitably of urbanization, IMM declares that the only way to overcome that paradox for the cities is to develop in a profound integration with the ecology. According to IMM, the fundamental prerequisite of ecologically sustainable development is to have a comprehensive systemic understanding of the built environment.

IMM suggests that the advancement in construction techniques, building materials quality and transportation technologies alone have not solved the complex problems of the urban life simply because such improvements are not necessarily dealing with the systemic integration. The core argument of IMM is that the performance of the city is being chiefly driven by the complex relationships subsystems rather than the independent qualities of the urban elements. Thus, it aims at portraying the systemic structure of the built environment by introducing a logical framework for modeling the linkage between the city's static and dynamic elements.

== Methodology ==
Integrated Modification Methodology is based on an iterative process involving the following four major phases:

1. Investigation
2. Formulation
3. Modification
4. Retrofitting and Optimization

The first phase, Investigation, is a synthesis-based inquiry into the systemic structure of the urban form. It begins with Horizontal Investigation in which the area under study is being dismantled into its morphology-generator elements, namely Urban Built-ups, Urban Voids, Types of Uses, and Links. It follows with Vertical Investigation that is a study of integral relationships between the mentioned elements. The output of Vertical Investigation is a set of quantitative descriptions and qualitative illustrations of certain attributes named Key Categories. In a nutshell they are types of emergence that show how elements come to self-organize or to synchronize their states into forming a new level of organization. Hence in IMM, Key Categories are the result of an emergence process of interaction between elementary parts (Urban Built-ups, Urban Voids, Types of Uses, and Links) to form a synergy able to add value to the combined organization. Key categories are the products of the synergy between elementary parts, a new organization that emerge not (simply as) an additive result of the proprieties of the elementary parts.

IMM declares that the city's functioning manner is chiefly driven from the Key Categories, hence, they have the most fundamental role in understanding the architecture of the city as a Complex Adaptive System. The Investigation phase concludes with the Evaluation step which is basically an examination of the system's performance by referring to a list of verified indicators associated with ecological sustainability. The same indicators are later used in the CAS retrofitting process necessary for the final evaluation of the system performance, after the transformation design process occurred.

The Formulation phase is a technical assumption of the most critical Key Category and the urban element within the area deduced from the Investigation phase. These critical attributes are being interpreted as the Catalysts of transformation and are to come to the designer's use to set a contextual priority list of Design Ordering Principals.

The third phase is the introduction of the modification/design scenarios to the project and advances with examining them by the exact procedure of the Investigation phase in a repetitive manner until the transformed context is predicted to be acceptable in arrangement and evaluation.

The fourth phase, Retrofitting and Optimization, is a testing process of the outcomes of the modification phase, then a local optimization by technical strategies (e.g. installing photovoltaic panels, designing green roofs, studying building orientations etc.) is initiated.

== See also ==
- Analysis
- Center for the Built Environment
- Chaos theory
- Circles of Sustainability
- Cognitive science
- Collaboration
- Complex system
- Design
- Design education
- Design Impact Measures
- Design research
- Design strategy
- Design thinking
- Ecology
- Ecological footprint
- Energy conservation
- Conceptual framework
- Heuristic
- Holistic
- Innovation
- Interaction design
- Intuition (knowledge)
- Method
- Observation
- Participatory design
- Principles of intelligent urbanism
- Programming paradigm
- Renewable energy
- Simulation
- Sustainable architecture
- Sustainable design
- Sustainable development
- Sustainable landscape architecture
- Sustainable preservation
- Sustainable refurbishment
- Wicked problem
- World Green Building Council
