= MOG (online music) =

Former online music service

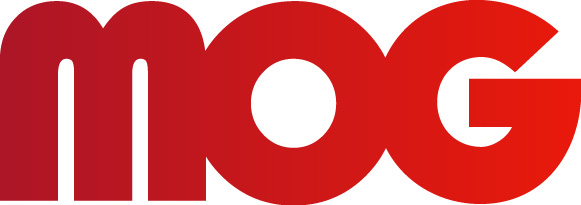

- Platform(s): Web; iPhone/iPod Touch, Android, Roku, Boxee Box
- Pricing model: 30-day subscription
- Availability: United States, Australia
- Website: mog.com

MOG was a paid subscription online music service and blog network, where subscribers could listen to and read about music. Subscribers could play tracks available in its catalog on a variety of digital devices, including computers, handheld devices, Sonos systems and television. MOG also allowed users to access aggregated editorial content from music blogs, user posts, and in-house editors.

MOG was founded by David Hyman, formerly CEO of Gracenote, SVP of Marketing at MTV Interactive, and Director of Ad Sales for Addicted to Noise. It was privately held and headquartered in Berkeley, California. The company raised capital from a variety of sources, including Balderton Capital, Menlo Ventures, Simon Equity, Universal Music Group, and Sony Music. Music producer Rick Rubin was a member of MOG's board of directors.

After purchasing MOG in 2012, Beats Electronics in January 2014 announced that the MOG service would shut down in the United States on 15 April 2014. This date was first indefinitely postponed, but then it was shut down on 31 May 2014. Its successor system, Beats Music, launched in the United States on 21 January 2014 and then was in turn acquired by Apple Inc. in May 2014.

== History ==
Founded in June 2005, MOG began as a music-themed social network and blog network. Users could create profiles with information about their music tastes, and the MOG-O-MATIC client application assisted in the process by scanning users' music libraries and populating their profiles with information about their music collection and listening activities. MOG also recommended users with similar music tastes. Users could compose blog posts, read posts composed by other users, and listen to 30-second samples of songs.

In late 2007, MOG partnered with Rhapsody to allow Rhapsody subscribers to access all of Rhapsody's content through MOG.

In August 2008, MOG launched the MOG Music Network, a music ad network that aggregated posts from affiliate blogs and those created by MOG's in-house music editors.

In December 2009, MOG launched a subscription music service, which allowed subscribers to stream any song in MOG's catalog to their computer through a web browser. In July 2010, MOG released mobile applications for iPhone, iPod Touch, and phones using the Android operating system, allowing subscribers to also access MOG's catalog from these devices.

In September 2010, MOG announced the release of a Roku channel, which enables subscribers to access the service from their television.

In June 2011, "Weird Al" Yankovic pre-released his album Alpocalypse on the MOG website.

In March 2012, reports surfaced that Beats Electronics—an audio equipment company then majority-owned by mobile phone maker HTC, was planning to acquire MOG.

In April 2012, MOG announced a partnership with Telstra to bring MOG to Australia, the first region outside of the US to have access. Telstra and MOG launched under the BigPond Music branding on 21 June 2012. This partnership also allows Telstra customers to stream without the content counting towards their data quota.

In July 2012, it was officially confirmed that Beats would acquire MOG's music streaming service for $14 million The acquisition did not include MOG's advertising network, the MOG Music Network, which was sold in a separate deal on 24 August 2012 to the radio broadcasting and media company Townsquare Media.

In January 2014, it was announced that MOG would be discontinued on 15 April 2014 in favor of Beats Music, and that existing subscribers would receive refunds. The shutdown was delayed to 31 May 2014. Former MOG subscribers were offered a free, 60-day trial of Beats Music.

In Australia, MOG was offered through Telstra's BigPond Music (BPM) service. Telstra officially announced the closure of MOG on 31 July, and the service ceased to operate on 11:59PM 31 August.

== Features ==
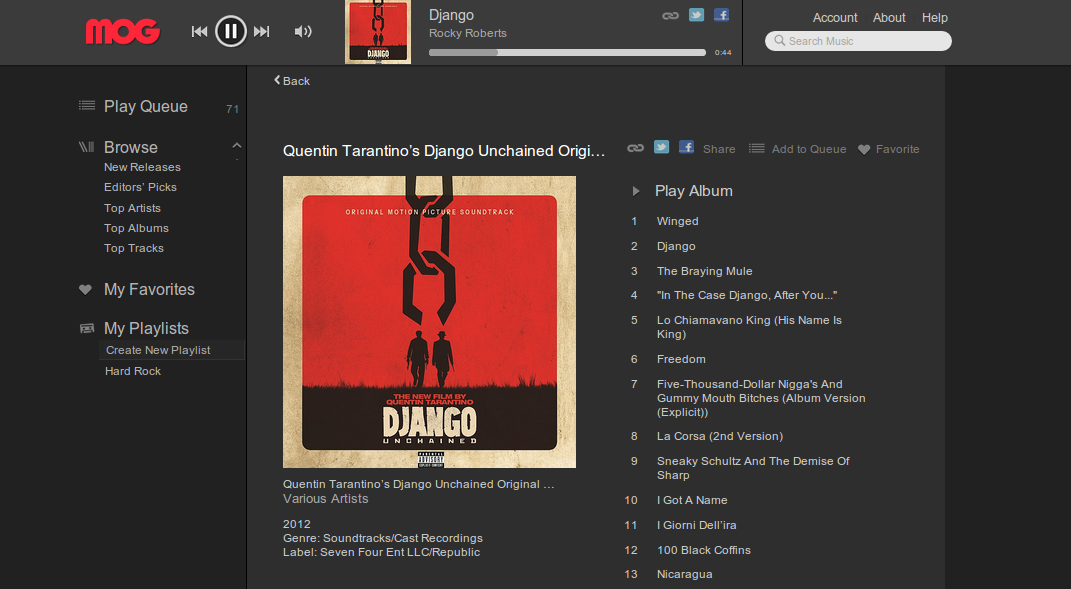
MOG's Web Player

MOG was a subscription service that allows users to play tracks from its catalog on a variety of digital devices, including computers, handheld devices, Sonos system and television (through MOG's Roku channel). The company claimed that its catalog was 16 million tracks, although it is not clear how the count was produced or audited. Songs could be streamed via the internet or stored on their devices so that they could be played without an internet connection. Web streams were 320 kbit/s MP3 files and mobile streams were 48 kbit/s AAC+ files. Users could choose whether mobile downloads were 'high-quality' 320 kbit/s MP3 files or 48 kbit/s AAC+ files.

MOG Radio, accessible through any of the platforms mentioned above, generated a continuous play queue based on the artist chosen by the user. By adjusting a slider within the MOG player (pictured at right) between Artist Only and Similar Artists, the user determined whether the radio plays only songs by the selected artist, or whether and how often songs by what the application determined to be "similar artists" were added to the queue. When a user's song selection ends, MOG Radio begins to play and continued until the user makes another selection.

The MOG Music Network was a music blog network that aggregated original content by in-house editors and syndicated content from more than 1,300 affiliate blogs. Affiliates signed up to reach MOG's 38 million monthly unique visitors in the US (as of April 2011) who clicked through from blog post excerpts on MOG to read the full post on the affiliate site.

== See also ==
- Deezer
- Grooveshark
- Guvera
- Last.fm
- List of online music databases
- Pandora
- rara.com
- Rdio
- Rhapsody (online music service)
- Simfy
- Songza
- SoundCloud
- Spotify
- Soundtracker (music streaming)
- Streaming media
- WiMP
