= Prairie Chapel Ranch =

Ranch in Texas, United States

Coordinates: 31°34′57″N 97°32′38″W

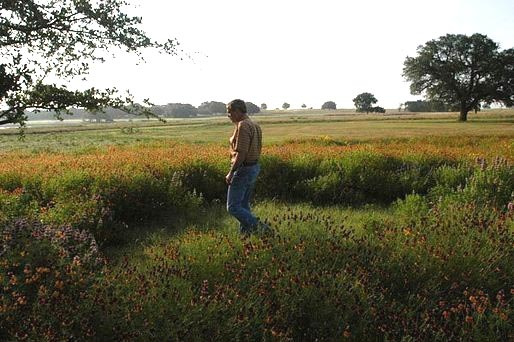
President Bush at his ranch

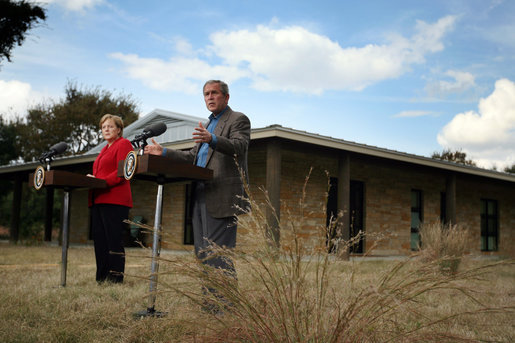
Angela Merkel and Bush outside the main house in November 2007

Prairie Chapel Ranch, nicknamed Bush Ranch, is a 1,583-acre (6.41 km^{2}) ranch in unincorporated McLennan County, Texas, located 7 miles (11 km) northwest of Crawford (about 25 miles (40 km) from Waco). The property was acquired by George W. Bush in 1999 and was known as the Western White House during his presidency. Bush spent vacation time at the house, where he also entertained visiting dignitaries from around the world. The ranch received its name from the Prairie Chapel School which was built nearby on land donated by mid-19th century German immigrant Heinrich Engelbrecht from Oppenwehe, Germany, who owned the land that now comprises the Bush ranch. Engelbrecht also donated land for the nearby Canaan Baptist Church (the "Prairie Chapel").

== History ==
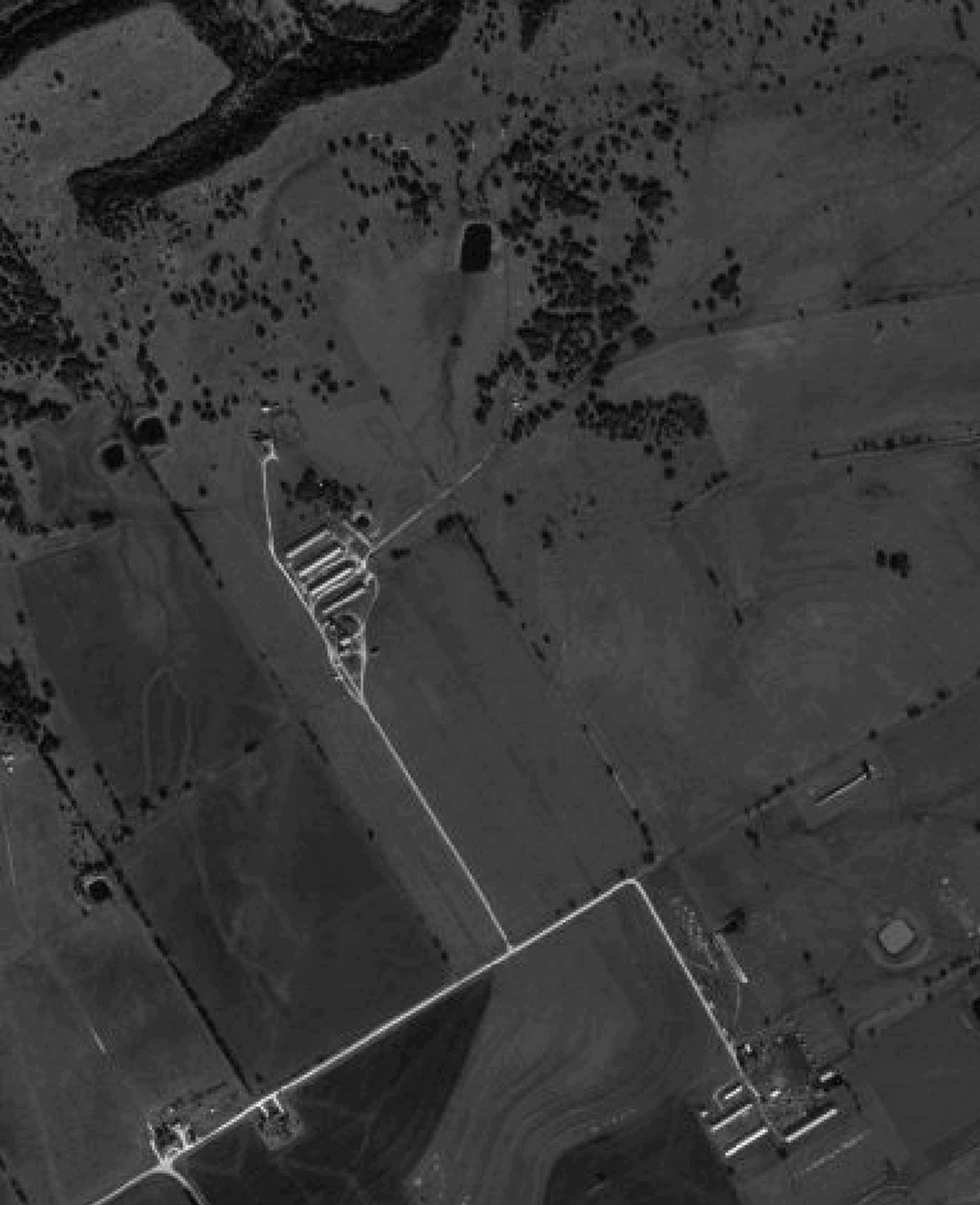
USGS aerial photograph of the ranch before Bush built his house. The elongated objects at the top are hog barns (on Mill Road). They were demolished and the drive extended to build Bush's house. He enlarged the lake on the upper right. In the lower right are more hog barns and the original Englebrecht house which is now called the "Governor's House." All of the lower barns except one were demolished. At the top is the Middle Bosque River. Prairie Chapel Road ends at the intersection in the lower-left corner and becomes Rainey Road.

Engelbrecht and his heirs raised turkeys and hogs. The original Engelbrecht ranch house is about 4,400 feet (1,300 m) from the main house on Rainey Road and is now called the "Governor's House" and is used to accommodate overflow guests. The Bushes stayed in the house during construction of the new house.

In 1999, a year before he was elected president, shortly after earning a $14.3 million profit from the sale of the Texas Rangers, then-Texas governor Bush bought the land for an estimated $1.3 million from the Engelbrecht family. Assisting Bush in arrangements for the purchase was the then Texas secretary of state Elton Bomer.

Bush removed five large hog barns on Mill Road leading into the compound in order to construct a new house, guest house, and garage.

On May 10, 2008, the ranch played host to the wedding of Jenna Bush to Henry Hager, a son of former lieutenant governor of Virginia, John H. Hager. The ceremony was relatively simple and was attended by some two hundred friends and family members.

== House and grounds ==
=== House ===
David Heymann, then an associate professor of architecture at the University of Texas at Austin, designed the four-bedroom, 4,000-square-foot (370 m^{2}) honey-colored native limestone single-level home with painted white galvanized tin roof manufactured and installed on the site. Heymann said the house was built from the less sought after portion of the local "Lueders limestone". The middle portion of each block of stone has a cream color, while the edges are multicolored. "We bought all this throwaway stone. It's fabulous. It's got great color and it is relatively inexpensive," Heymann said.

In addition there is an open 10-foot-wide (3.0 m) limestone porch that encircles the house. The house was built by Byron Bottoms Builder from nearby Elm Mott, Texas, and was not completed until after Bush's inauguration because of needed accommodations for security, meeting space, etc.

Laura Bush said they decided to keep a single level ranch design because "We wanted our older parents to feel comfortable here... We also want to grow old here ourselves."

The passive-solar house is positioned to absorb winter sunlight, warming the interior walkways and walls of the residence. ground source heat pumps circulate water through pipes buried 300 feet (90 m)) deep in the ground. A 25,000-US-gallon (95 m^{3}) underground cistern collects rainwater gathered from roof urns; wastewater from sinks, toilets, and showers cascades into underground purifying tanks and is also funneled into the cistern. The water from the cistern is then used to irrigate the landscaping around the home.

The one-story, eight-room, ground-level house runs east and west. There are no stairs, even at entrances. There are no thresholds. For the most part, the house is one room wide, making for easy ventilation. The porch is the usual route from one room to another. A few rooms have interior doors.

"Every room has a relationship with something in the landscape that's different from the room next door," Heymann says. "Each of the rooms feels like a slightly different place." In the guest bathroom, for example, when you look up from the sink, you look out on an oak tree rather than into a mirror, which is on a side wall.

"There’s a great grove of oak trees to the west that protects it from the late afternoon sun," Heymann says. "Then there is a view out to the north looking at hills, and to the east out over a lake, and the view to the south running out to beautiful hills."

Heymann says most of the rooms are relatively small and have high ceilings. The living-family room and the kitchen-dining room in the east end of the house are large, laid out for frequent entertaining and family gatherings. The living room has a series of glass picture doors. The tin roof of the house extends beyond the porch. When it rains, it's possible to sit on the patio and watch the water pour down without getting wet. Under a gravel border around the house, a concrete gutter channels the water into the cistern for irrigation. In hot weather, a terrace directly above the cistern is a little cooler than the surrounding area.

The Bushes installed a geothermal heating and cooling system, which uses about 25% of the electricity that traditional heating and air-conditioning systems consume. Several holes were drilled 300 feet (91 m) deep, where the temperature is a constant 67 °F (19 °C). Pipes connected to a heat pump inside the house circulate water into the ground, then back up and through the house, heating it in winter and cooling it in summer. The water for the outdoor pool is heated with the same system, which proved so efficient that initial plans to install solar energy panels were cancelled.

=== Other structures ===
In addition to the house there is a guest house and a garage in separate buildings to the southwest of the main house.

The facility includes a helicopter hangar which was used as an auditorium on the rare occasions when the former president held a press conference at the ranch.

In 2002, the ranch was wired for what Bush described in a 2003 tour of the ranch as "real time, secure videoconferencing" to be used for his briefings from the CIA and other secured communications.

Overnight visitors stay in the main house, its associated guest house, the original Englebrecht farmhouse, or in a five-bedroom three-bath mobile home.

News reporters stayed in hotels in Waco. Press conferences that did not involve the President were conducted in the gymnasium of Crawford Middle School, 10 miles (16 km) away from the ranch. The barn often seen behind TV correspondents during their live reports was actually on private property behind the school.

=== Grounds ===
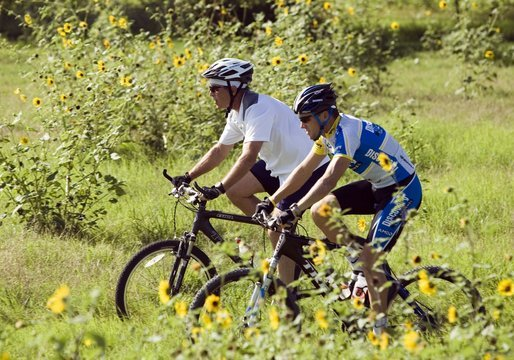
President Bush and Lance Armstrong on grounds in 2005

The land includes seven canyons and three miles (4.8 km) of frontage along Rainey Creek and the Middle Bosque River. In August 2001 while touring the canyons with reporters Bush noted that the cedars in the canyons would be a good nesting ground for the endangered golden-cheeked warbler although the warblers have not actually been seen on the compound.

Bush added an 11-acre (4.5 ha) man-made pond that he stocked with 600 largemouth bass and 30,000 bait fish. There are also bluegill and red ear sunfish. The pond has a maximum depth of 17 feet (5.2 m). In May 2006, when asked to name the best moment in his administration, Bush jokingly said: "I would say the best moment was when I caught a 7 1/2-pound [3.4 kg] largemouth bass on my lake."

At the urging of his daughters, Bush also built a swimming pool over the objections of Heymann who thought it would interrupt the stark views. Bush referred to it as "the whining pool"—whine long enough and you get it. It offers a respite from the hot Texas summers, and is heated by the same geothermal system as the house is during the winter.

== Activities ==
A prized souvenir from the ranch is a gray Under Armour athletic shirt emblazoned with a Texas star encircled by the words The President's 100-Degree Club. In order to qualify a visitor must run 3 miles (4.8 km), or bike for 10, when the thermometer hits triple digits.

When he was president, Bush used the ranch for vacations, meetings, and entertaining foreign dignitaries. In the less formal setting, dress code for meetings called for an open collar and no tie. When not holding meetings or briefings, Bush spent his time mountain biking, jogging, fishing, bird hunting, and clearing brush.

In 2001–2002, Bush held meetings with Russian President Vladimir Putin, British Prime Minister Tony Blair, and Saudi Arabian Crown Prince Abudallah in his 2001 Ford F-250 pickup truck at the ranch. The meetings were covered by the media as "pickup diplomacy" as part as a personal approach to foreign policy. For security concerns, Presidents cannot drive on public roads, but Bush could drive himself, dignitaries, legislators, press and others around the ranch in his truck. In 2013, President Bush donated his personal 2013 Ford F-150 King Ranch edition to be auctioned for charity.

Bush made clear his preference for spending some time away from his official residence at the White House in Washington, DC. In 2001, he said, "I think it is so important for a president to spend some time away from Washington, in the heartland of America."

=== Visits from foreign dignitaries ===
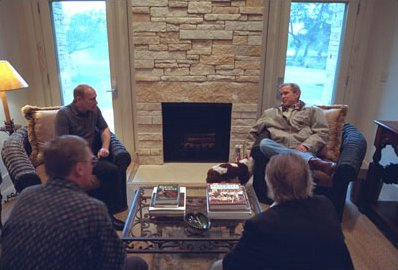
Putin and Bush in 2001

Visitors to the ranch have included:

- Russian President Vladimir Putin, November 2001
- British Prime Minister Tony Blair, April 2002
- Saudi King Abdullah, April 2002, April 2005
- Saudi Prince Bandar bin Sultan, August 2002
- Chinese President Jiāng Zémín, October 2002
- Spanish Prime Minister José María Aznar, February 2003
- Australian Prime Minister John Howard, May 2003
- Japanese Prime Minister Koizumi Jun'ichirō, May 2003
- Italian Prime Minister Silvio Berlusconi, July 2003
- Mexican President Vicente Fox, March 2004, March 2005
- Egyptian President Hosni Mubarak, April 2004
- Spanish King Juan Carlos and Queen Sofía, November 2004
- Canadian Prime Minister Paul Martin, March 2005
- Israeli Prime Minister Ariel Sharon, April 2005
- Colombian President Álvaro Uribe, August 2005
- German Chancellor Angela Merkel, November 2007
- Danish Prime Minister Anders Fogh Rasmussen, February 2008

==== Putin's visit to the ranch ====
On November 16, 2001, Vladimir Putin visited President Bush on his Prairie ranch where discussions were held as well as relationships amended. With the two holding a press conference at Crawford High School they spoke about how Russia is now an ally and that they should quit holding on to the dead weight of the Cold War and further their friendship with each other. They then spoke about Afghanistan and the arms control that they would like to see in the coming years. They agreed to deep cuts in long-range nuclear warheads. But they did not reach a deal on how to pave the way for testing and deployment of a U.S. missile defense shield. President Bush quickly turned serious. He returned to a theme that had echoed throughout the summit: That U.S.-Russian ties had entered a new phase and arms control was no longer the driving force. "We've found many areas in which we can cooperate and we've found some areas where we disagree. But nevertheless, our disagreements will not divide us, as nations that need to combine to make the world more peaceful and prosperous," he said.

== Security considerations ==
The Federal Aviation Administration had a full-time 3-nautical-mile (5.6 km) no fly zone, designated "Prohibited Area 49" (P-49), around the ranch during the Bush Presidency. When President Bush was in residence at the ranch, a Temporary Flight Restriction was issued, expanding the radius to 10 nautical miles (19 km), with lesser restrictions extending to 30 nautical miles (56 km), containing some exceptions for Waco Regional Airport nearby. The size of the restricted area P-49 was reduced in June 2010 to a 2-nautical-mile (3.7 km) radius up to an altitude of 2,000 feet, which is still in effect.

Bush normally flew in and out of TSTC Waco Airport (the former Connally Air Force Base that is now owned by Texas State Technical College) on Air Force One, and was shuttled on Marine One to the ranch.

== Gallery ==
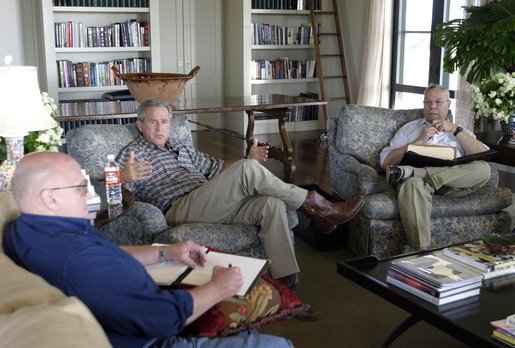
George W. Bush with Colin Powell and Richard Armitage

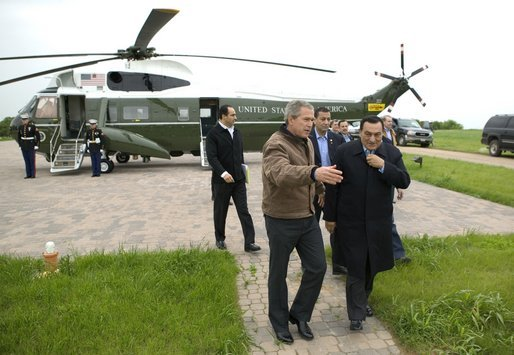
President Bush escorting Hosni Mubarak from an HMX-1 helicopter after his arrival at the ranch in 2004

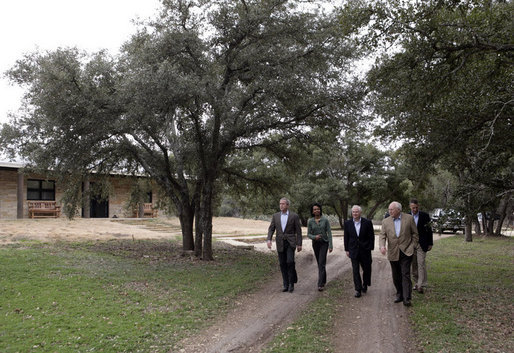
The President with Dick Cheney, Robert Gates, Condoleezza Rice and Peter Pace in 2006 at the ranch

== See also ==
- List of residences of presidents of the United States
