= Michael Goldberg (writer) =

American novelist (born 1953)

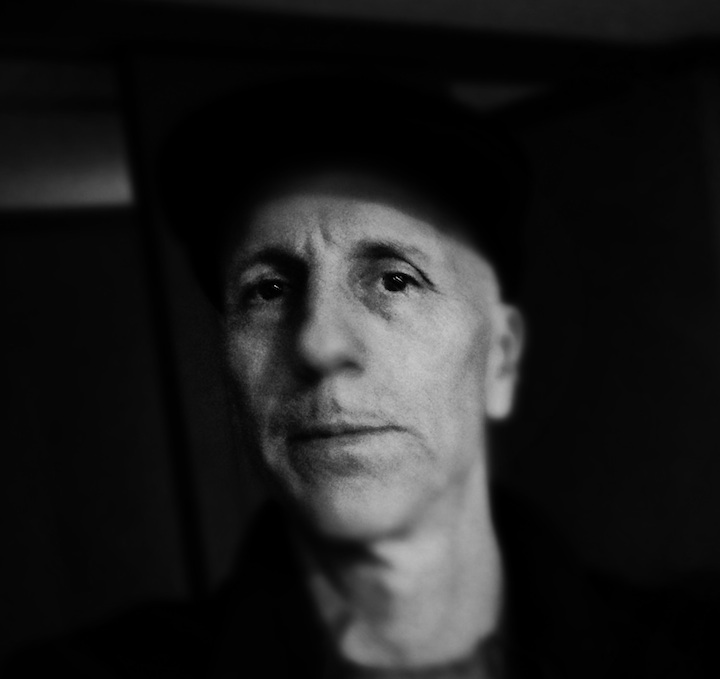
- Self-portrait (unknown date)
- Born: July 3, 1953 (age 73); Oakland, California, U.S.
- Education: Tamalpais High School; University of California, Santa Cruz

Michael Goldberg (born July 3, 1953) is an American novelist, journalist, animal rights activist, and pioneering digital music entrepreneur. He is known for his work (1983-1993) at Rolling Stone, where he was first a senior writer and later West Coast editor, and for envisioning and co-founding the first web music magazine, Addicted to Noise, in 1994, for which Newsweek included him in its 1995 "Net 50" list of "the 50 People Who Matter Most on the Internet". Between 2014 and the fall of 2016 he published the Freak Scene Dream trilogy of 1970s coming-of-age novels (True Love Scars, The Flowers Lied, and Untitled), and worked actively in animal rights causes. His nonfiction book, Wicked Game: The True Story of Guitarist James Calvin Wilsey (HoZac Books), was published in June 2022.

== Early years ==
Born in Oakland, California, Goldberg grew up across the San Francisco Bay in Marin County. He started writing short stories in elementary school, but seeing the Beatles on The Ed Sullivan Show turned him into an obsessive rock 'n' roll fan—as he later recalled, "It was like being hit by lightning or something." In 1967, while still in middle school, he launched a psychedelic poster business with a friend and photographed Jim Morrison and Ray Manzarek of the Doors and other artists at the KFRC Fantasy Fair and Magic Mountain Music Festival on Mount Tamalpais. That same year he bought the first issue of Rolling Stone and decided to become a music journalist.

As a student at Tamalpais High School in Mill Valley, Goldberg pursued both journalism and entrepreneurial ventures, serving as the school newspaper's arts editor, writing a music column, organizing a light show troupe, and promoting dance concerts, convincing then-guitar god Mike Bloomfield to perform at a school dance. Inspired by Rolling Stone, he and a friend published a rock magazine, Hard Road, interviewing Grateful Dead guitarist Jerry Garcia, who lived nearby; Goldberg photographed Garcia for the cover. Some of these experiences were the foundation for events in his first novel, True Love Scars.

During his undergraduate years at the University of California, Santa Cruz, Goldberg wrote for the local underground paper, Sundaz!, interviewing The Realist magazine’s founder/editor, Paul Krassner, for a cover story.

Working as a copy person at the San Francisco Chronicle after graduation, he broke into professional journalism with a feature story, co-written with his wife, Leslie Goldberg, on New Orleans band The Meters, published in Francis Ford Coppola’s magazine, City of San Francisco. He went on to contribute numerous articles to entertainment magazine Sunday Datebook on artists including Sly Stone, Stevie Nicks, the Clash, The B-52's, Muddy Waters, and Flipper; he photographed and interviewed legendary film director Nicholas Ray for the San Francisco Bay Guardian.

== Rolling Stone ==
From 1975 until the end of 1983, Goldberg developed his writing and reporting skills, getting published in magazines including Esquire, downbeat, Creem, Musician, New West, New Musical Express and more. "For those nine years my focus was to become a staff writer at Rolling Stone—that was my goal," he said, and during the last two of those years his freelance articles began to appear in the magazine. Hired at the end of 1983, he spent a decade at Rolling Stone as West Coast music editor and senior writer.

He wrote three Michael Jackson cover stories, as well as numerous other cover stories including Live Aid, Stevie Wonder, Boy George, and James Brown. He also wrote investigative pieces on music and the mob, the death of Dennis Wilson, the troubles of Brian Wilson and profiles of many artists including Robbie Robertson, Chris Isaak, and the first in-depth interview with Motown founder Berry Gordy, Jr.

During his time at Rolling Stone, Goldberg and writer Michael Snyder put together the Flamin' Groovies album Groovies' Greatest Grooves, for which they selected the tracks and wrote the liner notes. Goldberg also co-founded National Records, which released Rock Juice, the Flamin' Groovies' first album of new material in 13 years, in 1992.

== Addicted To Noise ==
In late 1993, after leaving Rolling Stone, Goldberg came up with the idea of an online music magazine. After trying unsuccessfully to interest established media companies in his business plan, and with just $5,000 in the bank, he partnered with programmer Jon Luini to launch Addicted to Noise (ATN). ATN, which went live December 1, 1994, was the first online magazine to include audio samples alongside new album reviews. ATN's daily "Music News of the World" quickly became a source of music news used by MTV, numerous radio stations throughout the world, and many print publications including the NME and Melody Maker.

In 1997, Addicted To Noise was acquired by Paradigm Music Entertainment (and merged with SonicNet, another music website), which in turn was acquired by TCI Music. In 1999, Viacom acquired TCI Music and folded it into MTV's online operation, MTVi. Goldberg became a senior vice president at SonicNet, also Editor in Chief of both SonicNet and Addicted to Noise.

Goldberg left MTVi in 2000. A year later he co-founded (with the artist/designer Emme Stone) the indie music and art website, Neumu. Newsweek called the site "an artsy oasis of music reviews, gallery exhibits and culture commentary." Goldberg was also a consultant at ARTISTdirect, MuchMusic and MOG.

== Novels ==
In 2008 Goldberg began writing what became the Freak Scene Dream Trilogy, a trio of novels set in the 1960s and early 1970s, viewed by narrator "Writerman" through the lenses of music, film, literature and visual art. Rolling Stone wrote of first installment True Love Scars (2014), "If Lester Bangs had ever published a novel, it might have read something like this frothing debut." Kerouac biographer Dennis McNally called Goldberg "Kerouac in the 21st century." The book made four of that year's best-of lists. Second installment The Flowers Lied was published in 2016; Untitled appeared in 2017.

Reading excerpts from the novels, Goldberg collaborated with the Grammy Award-winning experimental guitarist Henry Kaiser for two live "Post-Beat Happening" performances: one at Down Home Music in El Cerrito, California, in 2014; one at The Octopus Literary Salon in Oakland in May 2016.

== Nonfiction books ==
Goldberg’s essay “Bob Dylan’s Beat Visions (Sonic Poetry)” was included in a collection of essays, Kerouac On Record: A Literary Soundtrack, published in 2018. Both London's Times Literary Supplement (TLS) and Mojo singled out the essay as a highlight of the book. TLS: "Among the most successful chapters is 'Bob Dylan's Beat Visions' by Michael Goldberg which details specific borrowings on mid-1960s albums such as Bringing It All Back Home." Mojo: “Among the strongest in a strong lot are Michael Goldberg’s examination of Dylan’s lit roots and Kerouac’s own musicological piece — ‘The Beginning Of Bop’ – that attempts to capture jazz in words – and succeeds.”

In May 2018, Goldberg collaborated with guitarist/singer Johnny Harper for a performance, "The Dylan-Kerouac Connection", at The Art House Gallery and Cultural Center, in which Goldberg read from "Bob Dylan's Beat Visions (Sonic Poetry)" and Harper played the Dylan songs referenced in Goldberg's essay. In early July 2018, Goldberg read from his essay at an event celebrating the publication of "Kerouac On Record: A Literary Soundtrack” at the legendary literary center, Beyond Baroque, in Venice, CA. Goldberg also read from the essay at the Octopus Literary Salon in Oakland in September 2018 and at the Beat Museum in San Francisco in November 2018.

His book Wicked Game: The True Story of Guitarist James Calvin Wilsey (HoZac Books) was published in June 2022. Reviewing the book for Pop Matters, poet Marc Zegans wrote: "Goldberg’s meticulously researched biography delivers a deep-hearted and poignant account of the rare and extraordinary creative talent who—following his legendary entry into the music scene as bass player for San Francisco's primeval punk band, the Avengers—crafted the incomparable yearning two-note opening to Chris Isaak's 'Wicked Game.'" In the June 2022 "Bentley's Bandstand" column at his "Americana Highways website, Bill Bentley wrote: "This is the rock & roll book to read this year. It is a thrilling, heart-breaking, mind-blowing, cautionary and in the end passionate tale of how a guitarist of infinite ability and absolutely addictive tendencies attains the highest success on the rock & roll merry-go-round, only to flame out in a desperate tale of heroin, homelessness and, in the end, suicidal escapades that killed him. …" Rolling Stone online published an excerpt from the book, "Jimmy Wilsey’s Guitar Helped Make Chris Isaak's 'Wicked Game' a Smash. But Wilsey Was Never the Same After," in late May 2022.

In November 2022, Addicted To Noise: The Music Writings of Michael Goldberg (November 1, BackBeat Books), with a foreword by Greil Marcus, was published.

== Animal rights activism ==
In 2009, Goldberg became a vegan and an animal rights activist. From 2015 until 2018 he was a lead researcher for the international animal rights network Direct Action Everywhere and wrote about animal rights issues for the online magazine, The Daily Pitchfork. He participated in dozens of disruptions of Whole Foods stores and various restaurants, and was part of an action at Stanford Law School in February 2016 confronting Whole Foods co-CEO John Mackey. He took a hiatus from DxE beginning in 2021.

== Personal life ==
Goldberg is married to journalist Leslie Goldberg, who is also an artist with a master's degree in interdisciplinary art. Their son, Joe Goldberg, is general manager of Zeitgeist Artist Management and works with Death Cab for Cutie, She and Him, Thao and the Get Down Stay Down, the Postal Service and the New Pornographers. The couple have two grandchildren and two dogs.
