= MyMusic.com.ng =

Nigerian music download service

MyMusic Internet Limited
- Company type: Private
- Available in: English Language
- Founded: 2013; 13 years ago
- Headquarters: Lagos, Nigeria
- Country of origin: Nigeria
- Founders: Dolapo Taiwo, Tola Ogunsola, Damola Taiwo
- CEO: Tola Ogunsola
- Industry: Music
- Services: Music download
- Website: www.mymusic.com.ng
- Launched: 3 June 2015; 11 years ago
- Current status: Active
- Native clients on: Windows, Symbian, Windows Phone, Linux, BlackBerry OS, Android, ChromeOS, macOS
- Written in: PHP (with some third-party libraries)

MyMusic.com.ng is a commercial music download service that aims to provide a legitimate means of digital distribution of Nigerian music. It was founded by three Babcock University alumni; Damola Taiwo (COO and co-founder), Tola Ogunsola (CEO and co-founder) and Dolapo Taiwo (CTO and co-founder).

The service is presented on both mobile and web platforms and features multiple payment methods like the direct airtime credit billing, some of which are catered to deal with the unique challenges of the Nigerian market which is largely a cash only society.

The service aims to help reward Nigerian artists for their creative work and reduce piracy.

The Nigerian Communications Commission (NCC) has been reported to be in talks with stakeholders to propose a digital copyright piracy bill to the 8th National Assembly of Nigeria. The bill, called the Nigerian Copyright Act, will impose strict sanctions on digital copyright offenders while aiming to give content owners what is rightfully theirs.

== Availability ==
MyMusic is available on desktop as a full website with scaled up functionality, and as mobile website for smartphones and advanced feature phones. Supported devices include Symbian, Windows Phone, BlackBerry OS and Android OS. Mobile apps are also available for these devices.

== Features ==
The web platform provides the user with the opportunity to download tracks and albums, create playlists and download songs from playlists as well as register to manage their profile. Payment can be made globally with a credit card or through mobile airtime credit.

The mobile platform is deployed in what looks like a more simplified interface and features a music discovery and download process that seems effortless and straightforward. Users can pay globally using their mobile phone airtime credit though the global telco billing. Within 2 touches of a button, users can discover, pay for and download music.

== Launch ==
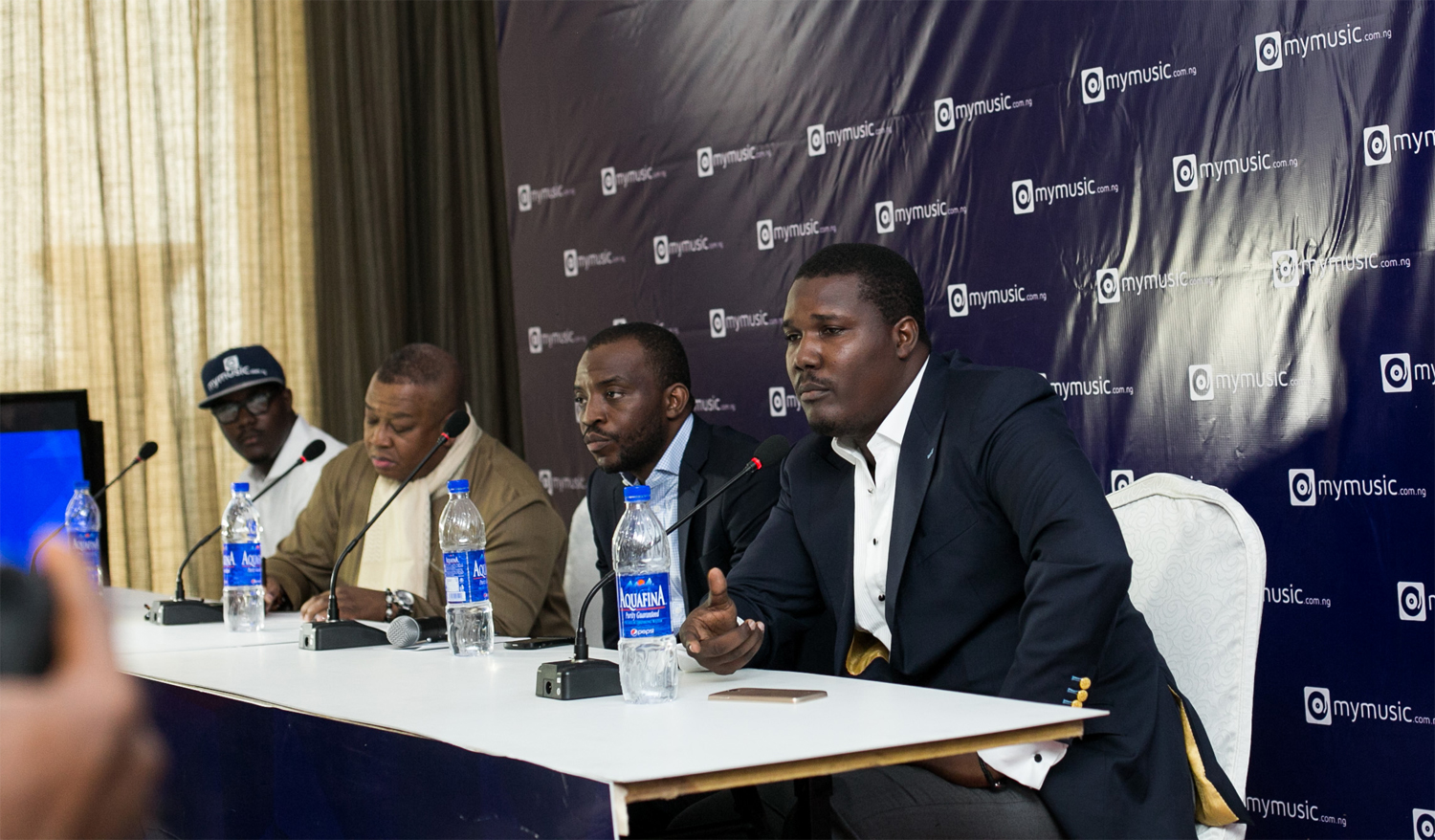
MyMusic launches at a world press conference in Lagos, Nigeria

www.mymusic.com.ng launched on 3 June 2015 at a world press conference held at the Oriental Hotel, Lagos. In attendance at the event were artists including Don Jazzy, Harrysong, Kcee and Ajebutter22. Other attendees included Tee Billz, Koffi Idowu Nuel, Asa Asika, Steve Babaeko and the MD of NIBBS, Mr. Adebisi Sonubi.

At the launch, the company also announced popular Nigerian OAP Olisa Adibua as a director in the company.

== Market size ==
In Nigeria, the music industry produces an average of 550 albums of different kinds of music yearly and industry stakeholders have projected that the country's entertainment industry would hit one billion dollars by 2016. The Nigerian population is estimated at 173 million and about 81 million people access the internet via mobile phones. A vast majority of these have their mobile phones as their only means of experiencing any form of communications technology.

== Partnerships ==
Facebook announced the launch of a new post format called Music Stories on 5 November 2015. This was done to promote better music sharing and discovery on the platform. Initially it was limited to specific streaming platforms such as Apple Music and Spotify. On 17 March 2016, MyMusic.com.ng was added as the first African partner to Facebook Music Stories. The partnership allows Africans and the global community share African music from MyMusic's library. Essentially, users will be able to play 30-second previews of songs shared directly on Facebook.

== Events ==
In November 2013, the team presented an earlier version of their product at the Dublin Web Summit and then later gave a demonstration of the finished product at the Mobile West Africa Conference 2015.
