= Institute of Molecular Medicine =

Institute of Molecular Medicine, or IMM for short, may refer to any of several scientific research institutions associated with universities:

- Instituto de Medicina Molecular, a research institution of the University of Lisbon, Portugal
- Weatherall Institute of Molecular Medicine, at the University of Oxford, United Kingdom
- Brown Foundation Institute of Molecular Medicine for the Prevention of Human Diseases, at University of Texas Health Science Center at Houston, United States

== See also ==
- Department of Cancer Research and Molecular Medicine, at the Norwegian University of Science and Technology.
