= Mainz Institute of Microtechnology =

Research-intensive, publicly held company

Institut für Mikrotechnik Mainz
- Type: Public
- Headquarters: Mainz, Germany
- Services: R&D service provider, across the divisions Decentralized & Mobile Hydrogen Technology, Flow & Formulation Chemistry and Bioanalytics & Diagnostics.
- Owner: German federal state of Rhineland-Palatinate
- Website: www.imm.fraunhofer.de/en.html

The Mainz Institute of Microtechnology (in German: Institut für Mikrotechnik Mainz, IMM) was a research-intensive, publicly held company owned by the German federal state of Rhineland-Palatinate. Its main areas of specialization were microfluidic systems for industrial, environmental and biomedical analysis and chemical processes technology and engineering. The IMM became a Fraunhofer research institute in 2013 and has been known as Fraunhofer Institute for Microengineering and Microsystems IMM ever since.
