= Beats Music =

Online music streaming service

- Website type: Internet radio, on-demand music
- Available in: English
- Area served: United States
- Owner: Apple Inc.
- Website: beatsmusic.com (archived on Wayback)
- Registration: Required
- Launched: January 21, 2014; 12 years ago
- Current status: Discontinued on November 30, 2015; replaced by Apple Music

Beats Music was a subscription-based music streaming service owned by the Beats Electronics division of Apple Inc. The service combined algorithmic personalization with curated music suggestions.

Development began in 2012 under the codename "Daisy." The service built upon Beats' line of consumer electronics as well as its 2012 acquisition of MOG, a former music streaming platform. The service was launched in the United States on January 21, 2014.

Beats Music was acquired by Apple Inc. as part of its purchase of Beats Electronics in May 2014. Beats Music stopped accepting new subscriptions when Apple Music launched on June 30, 2015, and all subscribers were eventually moved to the new service. Beats Music was then discontinued on November 30, 2015.

== History ==
On July 2, 2012, Beats announced it had acquired the online music service MOG, reportedly paying between $10 million and $16 million. Beats officials said that the acquisition was part of the company's goal to develop a "truly end-to-end music experience." The acquisition did not include the company's blog and advertising network, the MOG Music Network, which was sold in a separate transaction to the broadcasting company Townsquare Media in August 2012. MOG initially indicated that it would continue to operate independently with no immediate change in service.

A few months later in December 2012, the company hired Trent Reznor of the band Nine Inch Nails to serve as its chief creative officer, and to help develop a new music service codenamed "Daisy". As opposed to its competitors such as Spotify, in Daisy the plan was to use "personalization" based on user listening habits in combination with expert music curators to suggest tracks. The company initially announced a launch by late 2013. The company had hired music industry members, radio personalities, and songwriters to serve as a music curation team for the service, led by former IHeartMedia executive and KIIS-FM music director Julie Pilat.

In August 2013, a landing page was discovered for Daisy under its final name, "Beats Music". The service was officially unveiled in January 2014, for a launch in the United States on January 21. In February 2014, Beats Music reached a licensing deal with the Merlin Network, a group representing a number of major independent record labels. While no financial details were disclosed, Beats did indicate that it would pay the labels at the same rates as the major labels.

On March 4, 2014, Beats Music acquired Topspin Media, a company which deals in the monetization of music and building relationships between musicians and their fans. Beats Music CEO Ian Rogers had left Topspin to join the service.

=== Apple acquisition and shutdown ===
On May 28, 2014, Apple Inc. announced it was buying both Beats Electronics and Beats Music for US$3 billion in a cash and stock deal. The Wall Street Journal reported that Apple had valued Beats Music at "slightly less than $500 million." Following the purchase, Dr. Dre and Iovine were hired as executive employees, and worked at Apple for years afterward; Beats Music CEO Ian Rogers would oversee both Beats Music and Apple's ad-supported iTunes Radio service.

It was later reported by Business Insider that Apple was planning to merge the two services. Apple had hired noted British radio DJ Zane Lowe to serve as a music curator. It was also reported that, in negotiations with record labels for the new service, that Apple had been attempting to encourage record labels to pull their content from the free, ad-supported tiers of competing services such as Spotify in order to drive adoption of the new service, and offered an incentive to Universal Music Group to pull its content from YouTube. The United States Department of Justice and Federal Trade Commission launched an investigation into this alleged cartel in May 2015.

Apple Music was unveiled during Apple's Worldwide Developers Conference on June 8, 2015, and launched on June 30, 2015. Concurrently with the public launch of Apple Music, Beats Music was immediately discontinued; users could migrate their Beats Music subscriptions, including their account, saved playlists, and songs, to Apple Music.

== Features ==
Beats Music offered a library of over 20 million songs that could be streamed on-demand by users. Users could download songs for offline playback, which remained accessible for the period of their subscription. The service used a personalization system combining recommendations based on listening habits and algorithms with human curation and playlists from music professionals and publications such as Rolling Stone, Rap Radar, and Pitchfork. Song searches prioritized the original, master recordings of songs over other versions (such as covers). A feature known as "The Sentence" allowed users to generate playlists by filling four blanks in a sentence with words describing various activities, moods, and genres.

The basic subscription plan allowed access to the service on three devices for US$9.99 per month, or US$99.99 per year. Along with a web-based interface, apps were available for Android, iOS, and Windows Phone. Sonos announced that Beats Music would also support its wireless speaker systems on launch. A family plan with support for up to 5 people and 10 devices was also available for $14.99 per month, exclusive to family plan subscribers on AT&T Mobility. AT&T subscribers were also able to access a longer free trial period.

== Marketing ==
An advertisement for the service starring Ellen DeGeneres was aired during Super Bowl XLVIII in February 2014. Spoofing the fairy tale The Three Bears, the ad featured Ellen playing the role of Goldilocks.

== Personnel ==
- Jimmy Iovine – Co-founder and chairman of the Board of Beats Electronics and Beats Music
- Dr. Dre – Co-founder of Beats Electronics and Beats Music
- Luke Wood – President of Beats Electronics and vice-chairman of Beats Music
- Matthew Costello – Chief Operating Officer of Beats Electronics
- Ian Rogers – chief executive officer of Beats Music
- Fredric Vinna – Head of Product of Beats Music
- Bozoma Saint John – Senior Vice President, Head of Global Marketing, Beats Music
- Trent Reznor – Chief Creative Officer of Beats Music
- Ola Sars - Co-founder and Chief Operating Officer of Beats Music
- David Rotenberg - Vice President of Finance and Administration
