= Friar Society =

Honor society at University of Texas, US

- Founded: 1911; 114 years ago University of Texas at Austin
- Type: Honor
- Affiliation: Independent
- Status: Active
- Scope: Local
- Chapters: 1
- Members: 700+ lifetime
- Headquarters: Austin, Texas, Texas; United States
- Website: thefriarsociety.org

The Friar Society is the oldest honor society at the University of Texas at Austin.

== History ==
The Friar Society was founded in 1911 by Curtice Rosser and Marion Levy. Eight members were initially selected in the charter group. Originally, four men were chosen from the junior and senior classes every year on the basis of a significant contribution to The University of Texas.

Twenty-five years later, the Friars decided to start taking larger classes to accommodate the growing size of the university. Women were first admitted to the Friar Society on March 25, 1973.

In April 2011, the Friar Society celebrated the 100 year anniversary of its founding.

== Awards ==
The Friar Centennial Teaching Fellowship is an annual award given to a UT professor who has demonstrated excellence at the undergraduate teaching level. With a prize of $25,000, the award is the largest monetary award annually given to a UT professor.

In 1982, the Friars decided to create a teaching fellowship in honor of the upcoming centennial celebration for The University of Texas. Friar alumni raised $100,000 for this purpose, and this amount was matched by the Board of Regents to create an endowment.

In 2006, the Friar Society also created the Tany Norwood Award to honor one staff member or administrator a year.

== See also ==
- Collegiate secret societies in North America
- Honor society
