= Texas Society of Architects =

U.S. organization

The Texas Society of Architects is an organization based in Austin, Texas, that represents over 7,000 architects in Texas that are members of the American Institute of Architects (AIA).

The mission statement of the Society, is "to be the voice for Texas architecture, supporting the creation of safe, sustainable, and beautiful environments."

== Honors and awards ==
The AIA has long recognized individuals and organizations for their achievements in support of the architecture profession and the AIA. It bestows, on its members and others, honors and awards in several categories.

- Design Awards recognizing between ten and thirty outstanding designs each year
- Honor Awards recognizing about a dozen exceptional members each year
- Cornerstone Awards to one outstanding individual each year
- 25 Year Awards given each year to one notable architectural work 25–50 years in age
- Honorary Memberships recognizing individuals for long-term association with architects and architecture in providing a better quality of life in Texas.

Some members are also recognized by AIA Fellowships for architects who have made significant contributions to architecture and to society.
