= Design impact measures =

Design impact measures are measures used to qualify projects for various environmental rating systems and to guide both design and regulatory decisions from beginning to end. Some systems, like the greenhouse gas inventory, are required globally for all business decisions. Some are project-specific, like the LEED point rating system which is used only for its own ratings, and its qualifications do not correspond to much beyond physical measurements. Others like the Athena life-cycle impact assessment tool attempt to add up all the kinds of measurable impacts of all parts of a building throughout its life and are quite rigorous and complex.

The general field involves tying together environmental impact assessment and environmental accounting with systems ecology, cost estimation models, and cost–benefit analysis.

Though sustainable design has existed since 2008, the number and types of methods and resources that have become available since then has grown significantly. Many of these tools are preliminary guides to thinking about the complex processes of sustainable design in projects. As designers confront the impact of construction projects on the larger scale of human interaction with the earth, the problem of sustainable physical design grows increasingly complex and difficult.

Design impact measures are often used in DPSIR indicator models. As described in following sections of this page, there are many tools which help with data collection and impact measurements; however, without a framework within which to use these metrics, it is often difficult to make sense of them. The DPSIR indicator model provides this framework, which enables the proper presentation of the indicators required for various decision making or policy making. Establishing a proper and accurate DPSIR framework for specific environmental systems is a complex task.

== Simple Online Calculators ==
Simple online calculators allow users to estimate their individual environmental impact. The use of these calculators contribute to three main goals:

- Increase awareness about individual environmental impact
- Promote changes in behavior to reduce environmental impact
- Facilitate discussions around sustainability

There exist various types of online calculators that assess impacts related to Materials, Energy, Greenhouse Gas, Water, Solid Waste, Ecosystem, Pollutants, and more. The generally accepted way that these online tools calculate the impacts is:

- Request user input data
- Use the data provided in conjunction with Life Cycle Assessment (LCA) data to generate the impact results
- Compile and share the results with the user

The Energy Star building energy calculator and targeting tool is based on data from the United States International Energy Agency (US IEA) and Commercial Buildings Energy Consumption Survey (CBECS), which records long-term US nationwide energy use. Projects seeking for a Green Globes rating would use this calculator.

Another simple calculator that is available online is the "Build Carbon Neutral" calculator and, for UK users, the "Footprinter". These tools estimate a building's total carbon footprint by calculating easily visible parts, namely total surface area, building height, and ecoregion.

== Design Impact Measures for Buildings ==
Recently, there has been a transition to focus on the environmental impacts of buildings. Green Building is described by the US EPA as "Green building is the practice of creating structures and using processes that are environmentally responsible and resource-efficient throughout a building's life-cycle from siting to design, construction, operation, maintenance, renovation and deconstruction. This practice expands and complements the classical building design concerns of economy, utility, durability, and comfort.". The role of design impact measures for buildings is to assess the impacts of a building and identify opportunities for improvement. Simulation tools exist to optimize building systems. Some common impact measure categories are:

- Energy Consumption
- Water Consumption
- Material Use
- Recyclability of Materials
- Air Quality
- Water Quality
- Land and Soil Quality
- Virgin Resource Depletion
- Biodiversity and Habitat Loss
- Occupant and Worker Health
- Longevity of Building

These metrics categories assess the impacts of buildings and allow the identification of areas for improvement. Metrics are used in Ratings Systems, Standards, and Building Codes; some common ones are:

- Rating Systems
  - Leadership in Energy and Environmental Design (LEED) - developed by the United States Green Building Council (USGBC)
  - Building Research Establishment Environmental Assessment Method (BREEAM)
  - Living Building Challenge (LBC)
  - Passive House Institute United States (PHIUS)
  - SITES
  - WELL
- Standards
  - American Society of Heating, Refrigerating and Air-Conditioning Engineers (ASHRAE)
  - American National Standards Institute (ANSI)
  - ASTM International
- Building Codes
  - International Building Code (IBC)
  - International Green Construction Code (IGCC)

The common strategies for success across rating systems, standards, and building codes are:

- Reduce Building Demand
- Harvest Site Energy
- Maximize Building Efficiency and Resiliency
- Optimize Building Commissioning
- Optimize ongoing Operations and Maintenance

Other than the rating systems, standards, and building codes listed above, software platforms have been developed to facility the measurement, collection and aggregation, and comparison of these metrics. These platforms aid companies, within the building industry, track impact data and communicate goals and achievements. Some of these platforms are:

- "Athena Eco-Calculator": this calculator is an advanced and thorough life-cycle impact assessment tool for buildings
- "Arc Skoru Tool": this LEED-specific tool enables users to streamline data collection, generate impact scores, assess/improve impacts using modeling, and communicate key performance indicators
- "Measurabl": this ESG platform is an easily accessible all-in-one sustainability hub that enables users to measure, manage, disclose, and act on sustainability data

== Advanced Impact and Energy Analysis Tools ==
The United States Department of Energy (USDOE) offers a list of building energy tools for designers. While it is extensive, it may still be incomplete as new innovative tools are created. However, it contains a lot of resources for designers to begin with.

Other advanced analysis tools include:

- The "Greenhouse gas protocol": this is an intergovernmental data service used by the major international bodies for organizing the greenhouse gas data and reporting requirements. The protocols are organized by industry.
- The "EcoFootprint": this is a method of measuring a building's total use of productive land, or its ecological footprint. It uses data from studies indicating that human burden on renewable resources is significantly greater than the Earth's regenerative capacities. The results may not measure uncertainty, but it offers a comparable dimension

Recently, existing and emerging design and engineering software packages are also incorporating energy impact tools and climate modeling tools into their software. Many of them rely on the move to Building information modeling (BIM) data models that allow many consultants to work on the same building or urban design scheme at once.

== See also ==
- Sustainability
- Biodiversity
