= David Hyman =

American entrepreneur (born 1967)

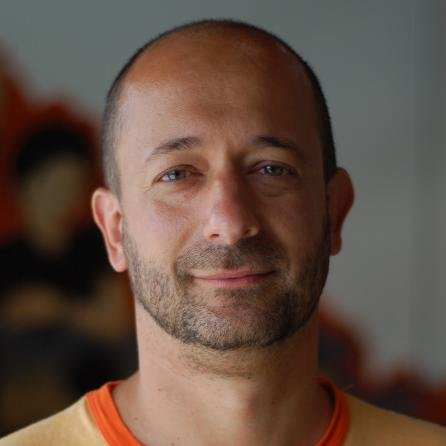
- David Hyman, founder of Unagi Scooters and former Beats Music CEO
- Born: October 17, 1970 (age 56); Melville, New York, U.S.
- Education: University of Vermont (B.S.)
- Occupations: CEO and co-founder of Unagi Scooters
- Known for: CEO and founder of MOG
- Children: 2
- Parent(s): Martin and Diane Hyman

David Hyman (October 17, 1971) is an American entrepreneur. He is the co-founder and CEO of Unagi Scooters, a manufacturer of electric scooters, which launched in December 2018. Hyman is also the former CEO of Beats Music, MOG, Gracenote and Blin.gy.

== Early life and background ==
Hyman was born and raised in Melville, New York. The son of Martin and Diane Hyman, he is the youngest of three siblings. His father Martin Hyman was executive vice president of Milgray Electronics. Hyman was educated on Long Island, graduating in 1985. He attended the University of Vermont from 1985 to 1989 and earned a bachelor's degree in Economics.

== Career ==
=== Wired Magazine / Hotwired ===
Hyman started his online career in online advertising sales at Wired Digital in San Francisco, California, where he was an active participant in the web's establishment of online advertising. While at Wired Digital he sold one of the first advertisements online and also created the first platform for pioneering e-commerce entities to advertise.

=== Sonicnet ===
From 1996 to 1999 Hyman worked as the senior vice president of sales and marketing at Sonicnet. From 1999 to mid-2000 he worked at MTV Interactive as the senior vice president of marketing, where he oversaw all marketing functions for MTV.com, VH1.com, Nickelodeon.com, and Sonicnet. Hyman was the voice-over announcer on the only television ads done in MTVi's and Sonicnet's history.

=== Gracenote ===
In 2000 Hyman created Gracenote and was its original president and CEO. There, he took fledgling compact disc identification technology (CDDB) and converted it into the world's largest music identification and music management company. Hyman's efforts helped to drive Gracenote to become core plumbing for all MP3 players & encoders in hardware and software. Gracenote was sold to Sony for $260 million in 2008.

=== MOG ===
In 2005 Hyman founded MOG in Berkeley, California.

=== Beats Music ===
In 2012, Hyman was CEO of Beats Music, the music subscription service created as an offshoot of Beats By Dre. Beats Music was subsequently sold to Apple along with Beats By Dre for $3 billion.

=== Blin.gy ===
In 2016 Hyman developed Blin.gy, the first augmented-reality mobile application enabling video segmentation, allowing anyone to superimpose their video or image into any video simply using their built-in mobile phone camera. There, he oversaw the development of a proprietary lightweight neural network to run on a mobile GPU with an inference engine trained to identify and separate humans from their background environments.

Blin.gy closed its operations in September 2017. Hyman wrote a eulogy to the company.

=== Unagi Scooters ===
In November 2018, Hyman launched Unagi Scooters on Kickstarter, generating $240,000 in revenue. Unagi has been praised as a quality portable electric scooter by numerous publications including The Verge, Gizmodo, and Endgadget.

== Personal ==
Hyman holds three patents: one in automatic meta-data sharing of existing media through social networking (US 7685132 B2), another in automatic meta-data sharing of existing media (US 7979442 B2), and a third in multiple-step identification of recordings (US 8468357 B2).

He is a frequent speaker at conferences such as SXSW, CES and Midem. In 2008, he founded Musica Tecnomica, a regular gathering of music-focused innovators in San Francisco.

=== See also ===
- Gracenote
- MOG (online music)
