= Rara (service) =

Defunct music streaming media service

rara
- Dissolved: 29 March 2015; 11 years ago
- Area served: Web, iOS, Android, Windows 8; 12 more countries including from Australia, Brazil, Canada, Denmark, Estonia, Finland, Germany, Hong Kong, Ireland, Luxembourg, Malaysia, Mexico, Norway, Poland, South Africa, Singapore, Sweden, UK, USA
- Owner: Omnifone (Original owner)
- Key people: Jez Bell (CEO); Rob Lewis (Chairman)
- Website: Website
- Launched: 13 December 2011; 14 years ago

rara was a music streaming media service. It operated between December 2011 and March 2015. It offered ad-free, on-demand music streaming from a range of major and independent record labels, including Universal Music Group, Sony Music Entertainment, EMI Music and Warner Music Group, global rights agency Merlin and independent digital distributors The Orchard, INgrooves Fontana, Believe Digital, [PIAS] and VidZone Digital Media.

Launched in December 2011 by British company rara Media Group Limited, the service featured an initial music catalogue of approximately 10 million tracks. As of October 2013, the catalogue offered 22 million tracks and was available in 32 countries. The system was accessible on both PC and Mac via the web with apps for Windows 8, iOS, and Android. A rara "web" subscription provided unlimited music streaming via the web to PC and Mac while a "premium" subscription enabled access to rara mobile apps as well as offline access to music.

In between February and March 2015, rara stopped accepting new subscribers and announced that the service was up for sale. Music streaming stopped on 29 March.

== Features ==
rara had a catalogue of over 22 million tracks licensed. It provided unlimited on-demand music streaming. Web users could create playlists which were synchronised through the cloud with their other rara devices. rara used a team to curate channels and playlists, categorised by mood, genre, era and currently trending. rara created personalised music recommendations that were both algorithmically generated and hand curated by rara's team. Powered by Dolby Pulse, rara streamed audio on web and via apps at a bitrate of 320 kbit/s.

== Platforms ==
rara was available on web via PC and Mac and also via apps for iPhone, iPad, iPod Touch, Android and Windows 8 PCs and tablets. The rara web streaming service was launched on 13 December 2011. The rara Windows 8 app was introduced on 23 October 2012. It was the first on-demand music streaming app to launch on Windows 8 apart from Microsoft's own Xbox music service which was bundled with all Windows 8 devices. The rara iPhone app was introduced on 23 October 2012. The rara iPad app was launched on 23 October 2012. The rara Android app was launched on 13 December 2011.

BMW ConnectedDrive Online Entertainment was first announced by BMW on 19 May 2013 for BMW 5 Series 2013 facelift models. The first compatible vehicles with Online Entertainment included became available to drive from late July 2013. On 6 December 2013 Online Entertainment with rara became available to purchase in all BMW Series 1-7, the M series and the X5 model.

== Territories ==
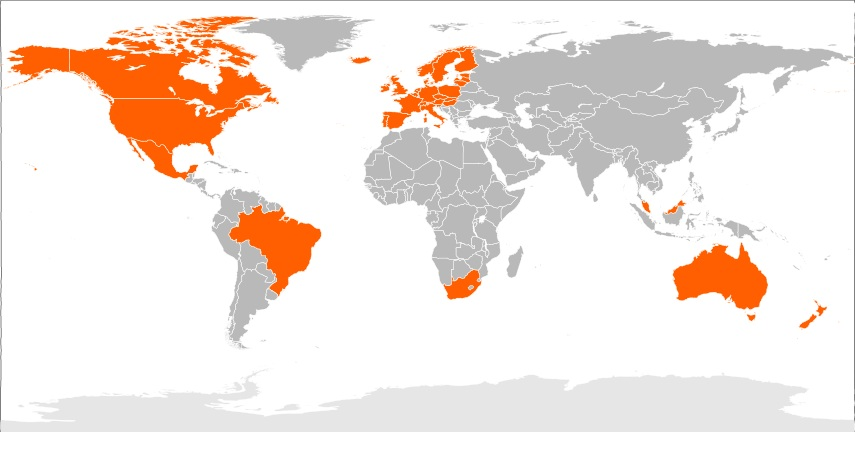
Availability of rara in the world

rara was available in 32 countries: US, Canada, UK, Ireland, France, Spain, Italy, Germany, Austria, Belgium, The Netherlands, Luxembourg, Switzerland, Sweden, Denmark, Norway, Finland, Portugal, Poland, Hungary, Czech Republic, Lithuania, Latvia and Estonia, Mexico, Brazil, Australia, New Zealand, Singapore, Hong Kong, Malaysia and South Africa. rara individually tailors its music service for every territory, with local language support and a localised music catalogue for each country.

== Partnerships ==
rara was partnered with HP, BMW, Toshiba and Lenovo and was preloaded onto a range of HP PCs and Lenovo Windows 8 and Android PCs, tablets and Windows 8 convertible devices.

== History ==
Located in London, England, rara was spun out of digital music service provider Omnifone prior to launch in December 2011. The service was run by parent company rara Media Group Limited with its back end technology platform powered by Omnifone.

The rara.com web streaming service and rara Android mobile app was launched on 13 December 2011 in 16 countries across the US, UK, Ireland, France, Germany, Italy, Spain, Austria, Belgium, Denmark, Finland, Luxembourg, the Netherlands, Norway, Sweden and Switzerland, with 10 million tracks from all major labels and a global partnership with HP. On 14 December 2011 rara announced its launch in New Zealand. On 20 January 2012 rara announced its launch in Australia, Canada and Singapore.

On 31 January 2012 PRS for Music announced a pan-European licensing deal securing royalties from rara for the songwriters, composers and music publishers it represented across Europe.

On 18 July 2012, rara appointed Coca-Cola executive Nick Massey as CEO.

On 23 October 2012 rara launched apps for iOS and Windows 8 devices and announced music licensing deals with independent distributors Merlin, The Orchard, INgrooves Fontana, Believe Digital, VidZone Digital Media and an expanded global licensed catalogue to 18 million tracks. rara.com also announced it had added 7 new countries; Brazil, Mexico, Hong Kong, Taiwan, Malaysia, South Africa and Portugal, increasing rara.com's territory reach to 27 markets.

On 20 December 2012 rara announced a licensing deal with independent distributor [PIAS] and the addition of 6 new Eastern European countries; Poland, Hungary, Czech Republic, Lithuania, Latvia, Estonia, expanding its international territory reach to 33 countries worldwide.

On 8 March 2013 rara announced Omnifone and PRS for Music executive Jez Bell as CEO.

On 21 May 2013 rara announced an international partnership with BMW to provide Europe's first in-car music streaming service. On 11 October 2013 rara announced a partnership with Toshiba to pre-load the rara app on Toshiba Windows 8 PCs, tablets and convertible devices in Australia, New Zealand and Hong Kong. On 6 December 2013 rara expanded Europe's first in-car music streaming service across the BMW range. rara was available in BMW Series 1-7, the M Series and the X5.

In early 2015, rara announced that the company was for sale and would shut down if a buyer was not found. Unlimited music streaming and premium shut down on 29 March in all 32 countries. In June to October, the official homepage still ran without the "sign up", "prices" or "social network" options. However, the page still had the "email" and "sign in" options. The website was finally shut down in November.

== See also ==
- List of online music databases
- List of Internet radio stations
