= Index of DOS games (U) =

Index of DOS games

This is an index of DOS games.

This list has been split into multiple pages. Please use the Table of Contents to browse it.

Title	Released	Developer(s)	Publisher(s)
Ugh!	1992	Egosoft	Play Byte
Ultima I: The First Age of Darkness	1987	Richard Garriott, Origin Systems	Origin Systems, Electronic Arts
Ultima II: Revenge of the Enchantress	1982	Richard Garriott	Sierra On-Line
Ultima III: Exodus	1983	Richard Garriott	Origin Systems
Ultima IV: Quest of the Avatar	1985	Richard Garriott	Origin Systems
Ultima V: Warriors of Destiny	1988	Richard Garriott	Origin Systems
Ultima VI: The False Prophet	1990	Origin Systems	Origin Systems
Ultima VII: The Black Gate	1992	Origin Systems	Origin Systems
Ultima VII: The Forge of Virtue	1992	Origin Systems	Origin Systems
Ultima VII Part Two: Serpent Isle	1993	Origin Systems	Origin Systems
Ultima VII Part Two: The Silver Seed	1993	Origin Systems	Origin Systems, Electronic Arts
Ultima VIII: Pagan	1994	Origin Systems	Origin Systems
Ultima VIII: Pagan - Speech Pack	1994	Origin Systems	Origin Systems
Ultima Underworld: The Stygian Abyss	1992	Blue Sky Productions	Origin Systems
Ultima Underworld II: Labyrinth of Worlds	1993	Looking Glass Technologies	Origin Systems
Ultima: Worlds of Adventure 2: Martian Dreams	1991	Origin Systems	Origin Systems
Ultimate Body Blows	1994	Team17	Team17
Ultimate Domain	1992	Microïds	Software Toolworks
Ultimate Doom	1995	id Software	id Software
Ultimate Soccer Manager			
Ultimate Soccer Manager 2			
Ultimate Wizardry Archives, The			
Ultrabots	1993	Novalogic	Electronic Arts
Ulysses and the Golden Fleece	1982	Sierra On-Line	Sierra On-Line
UMS II: Nations at War	1990	Intergalactic Development	Rainbird Software
UMS: The Universal Military Simulator	1987	Rainbird Software	Rainbird Software
Uncharted Waters	1990	KOEI	KOEI
Uncharted Waters 2: New Horizons	1995	KOEI	KOEI
Under a Killing Moon	1994	Access Software	Access Software
Under Fire!	1987	Avalon Hill	Avalon Hill
Uninvited	1993	ICOM Simulations	Mindscape
Universe	1994	Core Design	Core Design
Unlimited Adventures	1993	MicroMagic	Strategic Simulations
Unnatural Selection	1993	Maxis	Maxis
Unnecessary Roughness '95	1994	Accolade	Accolade
Unreal	1991	Ordilogic Systems	Ubi Soft
Untouchables, The	1989	Ocean Software	Ocean Software
Urban Runner	1996	Coktel Vision	Sierra On-Line
Uridium	1988	Hewson Consultants	Hewson Consultants
U.S. Navy Fighters	1994	Electronic Arts	Electronic Arts
Utopia: The Creation of a Nation	1991	Celestial Software	Gremlin Interactive
