= David R. Watson =

American bowyer and composer (born 1948)

David R. Watson (1948-) is a bowyer currently living in Austin, Texas. He has composed music for the Ultima series, including "Stones". Watson is a fencing master, a composer, and musician; and has a varied career of video game support including level designer in X-COM: Apocalypse, lead mission analyst in Grand Theft Auto: San Andreas, and music composer in Ultima.

Watson is also known by his Ultima alter ego, Iolo. His late wife, Kathleen Jones, was also an Ultima character, Gwenno, Iolo's in-game wife.

== Games credited ==
=== Music ===
- Ultima V: Warriors of Destiny (1988), Origin Systems (first appearance of his song "Stones")
- Ultima VI: The False Prophet (1990), Origin Systems
- Ultima VII: The Black Gate (1992), Origin Systems
- Ultima VII Part Two: Serpent Isle (1993), Origin Systems
- Ultima VII: The Silver Seed (1993), Electronic Arts

=== Level design ===
- X-COM: Apocalypse (1997), MicroProse

=== Gaffer ===
- Stonekeep (1995), Interplay Productions

=== Product Marketing Managers ===
- You Don't Know Jack: Volume 3 (1997), Sierra On-Line
- You Don't Know Jack: Television (1997), Berkeley Systems
- You Don't Know Jack: Volume 4 - The Ride (1998), Sierra On-Line

== Books ==
- Iolo's First Book of Crossbows
- 1920 Tunguska Terror: Aero Rangers vol. 1
