= Ultima IX: Ascension =

1999 role-playing video game

- Developer: Origin Systems
- Publisher: Electronic Arts
- Director: Richard Garriott
- Producer: Eric Lux
- Designer: Seth Mendelsohn
- Programmer: Bill Randolph
- Artist: Scott Jones
- Writers: Brian Martin; Michael Morlan
- Composer: George Oldziey
- Series: Ultima
- Platform: Microsoft Windows
- Release: NA: November 23, 1999; EU: March 17, 2000
- Genre: Role-playing
- Mode: Single player

Ultima IX: Ascension is a 1999 role-playing video game developed by Origin Systems and published by Electronic Arts for Microsoft Windows. It is the ninth and final main installment of the Ultima series.

It takes place after the Avatar's escape from Pagan, where he is transported back to Britannia for one final battle with the Guardian, who is increasingly ruining the physical and moral fabric of that land by the use of eight columns. The Avatar must fight his way to the runes of virtue found in each of the columns, and cleanse them in the shrines of Virtue, then face off against the Guardian himself.

The game received mixed reviews from critics, with significant criticism on its lack of polish and disregard for previous installments in the series, though the gameplay received praise.

== Gameplay ==
The main view of Ultima IX. This was the first Ultima game to feature 3D polygon rendering.

A difference from previous Ultima games is that in Ultima IX the player has less control of what path to take in the game. Most areas of Britannia are blocked off until specific tasks are completed, reducing the amount of initial exploration available to the player.

The game world is rendered in a detailed and seamless manner, but Britannia is much smaller in overall area than previous games. For example, Britain, the largest city of Britannia, consists of only a few buildings.

== Plot ==
In the beginning of Ultima IX, the Avatar had somehow returned to Earth for an unspecified amount of time before getting back to Britannia. The game starts just after the end of Ultima VIII, in which the Avatar is transported to a Guardian-controlled Britannia. He arrives in Britannia on a mountain overlooking the Guardian's keep in Terfin. The Avatar is transported to Stonegate by Hawkwind the Seer (from Ultima IV), who informs him that great columns have appeared throughout the land, and their malignant influence has caused plagues, famine, and other natural disasters. Under their power, the people of Britannia have twisted the Virtues into mockeries of their true meaning. The Guardian is helped by Lord Blackthorn, who leads the Wyrmguards and forces the people to obey the Guardian.

As the quest progresses, the Avatar learns that the Guardian has stolen the Runes of the Virtues and twisted them into the glyphs that form the heart of each of the columns. Most of the game consists of traveling through the dungeons to recover the glyphs and visiting the Shrines of the Virtues to meditate and cleanse them. Eventually, it is revealed that the Guardian is nothing other than the dark half of the Avatar himself, and the only way to save Britannia is for the Avatar to ascend to a higher plane, taking the Guardian with him. The player is able to accomplish this via an Armageddon spell cast behind a Barrier of Life, which takes the Avatar and the Guardian to a higher plane out of Britannia.

=== Original plot ===
Origin Systems released a number of preview video clips in the five years between the original release of Ultima VIII and the final release of Ultima IX in December 1999, first in the Ultima Collection and intermittently in between. These screenshots and clips pointed to a totally different plot from the released version, which many longtime fans of the Ultima saga agreed was unsatisfying and unrewarding.

On December 9, 1999, a synopsis of the original script was posted to the "Ultima Horizons" discussion board. The synopsis was written by Bob White and released with his permission. White worked directly with Garriott, John Watson, and Brian Martin in developing the game's original story before leaving Origin.

The beginning of the game is more or less the same as the beginning of the actual Ultima IX release, except that the Avatar never actually returns to Earth after his sojourn in Pagan in Ultima VIII. Just as in the official plot, there are also columns created by the Guardian with malignant influence. Further, Lord British has become enfeebled and left government of the kingdom in the hands of a tribunal consisting of the lords of the cities of Moonglow, Britain, and Jhelom, but they have proved unable to deal with the crises and have fractured into mutually distrustful city-states that are, at the time the Avatar arrives, at the brink of war.

The Guardian is behind all of this, orchestrating these events with the aid of Lord Blackthorn, but few within the kingdom suspect this. Among those suspicious is Samhayne, a benevolent smuggler of contraband and food supplies to the various cities. He enlists the aid of the Avatar to find proof of these shadowy manipulations that are causing Britannia to disintegrate. With the help of his longtime friends Shamino and Iolo and Samhayne's protégé Raven, they uncover that Lord Blackthorn is secretly advising members of the council and goading them to war. Blackthorn is unmasked just as the armies of the council have taken the field of battle. He is eventually caught at Terfin and executed at Lord British's command, but the Guardian escapes.

The Avatar and Lord British then travel to Stonegate for the final confrontation with the Guardian, but after it appears that they had successfully killed him, they are told that it is not enough. The columns that the Guardian created have embedded themselves too deeply within the very fabric of Britannia itself, and soon they will destroy the world, funnelling the power of its destruction back into the Guardian, resurrecting him and making him even stronger. The only way to destroy the Guardian is to extinguish the life force of Britannia itself, but the people may be saved by evacuating them to the island of Skara Brae and using the power of the Runes of Virtue to protect them. The Spell of Armageddon is cast, Britannia is destroyed, along with the Guardian and Lord British, but the Avatar ascends to a higher plane of existence by the power of the spell. The people that were evacuated to Skara Brae are protected by the Runes and they live on, to find another world to call their own.

This plot specifically compares the destruction of Britannia and the island of Skara Brae flying off into space with the Roger Dean paintings from the album Yessongs.

== History ==
=== Development ===
There have been at least four distinct versions of Ultima IX in development, which have differed in both storyline elements and technological implementation.

The first version was as it was conceived of by Ultima creator Richard Garriott during his initial planning for the third Ultima trilogy as Origin began to work on Ultima VII. The original concept for the third Ultima trilogy appeared to have focused on the Avatar's conflict with the enigmatic Guardian, each game taking place in a different world: Ultima VII in Britannia, Ultima VIII in the conquered world of Pagan, and Ultima IX in the Guardian's homeworld itself. Also, Ultima IX was planned to be built on the isometric Ultima VIII engine.

Criticism of Ultima VIII altered Origin's plans for Ultima IX, which Garriott told Computer Gaming World in 1994 would go "back to the virtues that made Ultima as distinctive as it was originally". Warren Spector—the producer of Ultima V and Ultima VI, whom Garriott put in charge of Ultima IX development—hoped that it would depict the Avatar on a quest for virtue with a more integrated story than in Ultima IV, the game many believed was the best of the series. The second version of Ultima IX was developed between 1995 and 1997. In a text file included with the final patch (v2.12) for Ultima VIII, called "fans.txt", it is stated that "The design of Ultima IX (which is still in progress) relies heavily on this feedback and has resulted in a dramatic turnaround back toward classic role-playing. Even better, it has resulted in a classic Britannian Ultima." At this point, the gameplay of Ultima IX would have been re-located to Britannia, and a new storyline would have to be written to incorporate this change. Garriott said that the game would be the final one in the original Ultima universe, concluding both the Guardian trilogy and the Avatar Chronicles. He shared his other plans for the game: "Ultima VII had the most detailed world, so we're going to take that detail level, we're including a huge ethic parable like those of Ultima V and VI, and it will contain the hard-core role-playing elements of the first three games, with a complete set of skills and attributes. From a technology standpoint, we've tried to add the visual detail levels of Ultima VIII, but we'll drop that control method."

By early 1996, the first screenshots of Ultima IX appeared in gaming magazines and Origin started to reveal some information about the plot and gameplay aspects of the game. These previews of the game demonstrated the software-rendered 3D engine that now powered Ultima IX. The camera appeared locked into an overhead view that approximated the isometric point of view of Ultima VIII, but could be rotated about its vertical axis and zoomed in or out. According to Garriott, this camera perspective was chosen because it limited rendering to the strip of the game world that was coming into view, allowing the team to include the sort of detailed objects that were standard for the Ultima series without making the frame rate unreasonably low. Images of the pre-rendered cinematics also began to appear at this time. Some of these images showed the Avatar in a rocky, barren landscape with a red sky and it was at this time that it was first stated that the Avatar had actually arrived in Britannia at the end of Ultima VIII and that the Guardian had now conquered the world.

An early screenshot of Ultima IX in development

"By the time of Ultima VIII, we really felt we had driven ourselves into this Ultima niche where we had lots of historical Ultima customers but we weren't getting very many new customers. So what we wanted to do with Ultima VIII was focus a lot of attention on the animation and presentation, but the trade-off was that the world detail suffered, and so the game didn't go down quite so well with the old school of Ultima players. ... The real test is going to be Ultima IX, because after VIII we're not sure if we have the same audience. We've picked up new players, but we may have alienated some of the old."

— Richard Garriott, October 1996

With the unexpected success of the beta phase of Ultima Online (UO), Origin moved most of the Ultima IX team to work on that game in late 1996. By the time work resumed on the game in late 1997, corporate interest in Ultima IX had greatly diminished, many of the original team members had left Origin, and the 3D engine was already becoming out of date. Ultima IX had a technically impressive game engine, but it was completely software-rendered and would not be able to compete with newer engines taking advantage of 3D hardware acceleration. The 3D models were built in LightWave 3D with 16-bit textures, but when rendered in software the textures had to be reduced to 8-bit.

Once Ultima IX resumed production in late 1997, Origin hired Ed del Castillo, who had produced such hits as Command & Conquer, as producer of the title. The third version of the game was developed between 1997 and 1998. The Ultima IX team experimented with different camera angles in the now hardware-accelerated 3D engine and decided that a third-person over-the-shoulder perspective, similar to that used in Tomb Raider, made for the best view of the graphics and could run well even when rendering the full 16-bit textures.

Over the next few months, it was revealed that the game would no longer have a party of companions for the Avatar and would once again be a single-character game. The amount of art and voice recording work required meant that there would not be a female Avatar option. The plot had changed as well. Many aspects of the previous plot still seemed to be present, but Britannia appeared to be a world much more firmly under the Guardian's grasp. The player would control the Avatar throughout most of the game, but some parts of the game would put him in control of Lord British, Shamino, or the female pirate Raven.

In early 1998, several designers of the game, including lead designer Bob White, left Origin. By the middle of 1998, del Castillo resigned due to "philosophical differences", Garriott took a more active role in the production of the game, and Seth Mendelsohn joined the team as lead designer. They re-wrote the entire story for the game, now focusing on the Avatar's final visit to Britannia, and the reaction of the people of Britannia to this news. Some elements of the previous storyline were kept, presumably to make use of the existing (and expensive) pre-rendered cinematics, but most of them were either heavily edited or used in a dramatically different context than originally intended, and sometimes both.

=== Release and versions ===
The game's release was initially complicated by a rather buggy first issue, with very advanced hardware requirements for the time; the design team had objected strongly to the timing of release, but the Electronic Arts management enforced it. A few months later, a fixed version was released; a further unofficial fix was leaked on the Internet a bit later by an anonymous member of the team.

At the time of initial release, EA also produced a "Dragon Edition" of the game. It included an extra-large box, prints of in-game artwork, tarot cards, an ankh pendant, and special versions of the game books. Later, a "World Edition" was released containing copies of both Ultima IX: Ascension and Ultima Online: The Second Age.

With the previous Ultima VIII considered to be a failure with weak sales, the poor reception of Ultima IX effectively killed the Ultima franchise; all other Ultima projects were cancelled and no other Ultima was ever released, save for expansion packs for Ultima Online. Electronic Arts explained that they were concentrating everything on Ultima Online 2; however, that, too, was cancelled, although the original Ultima Online remained active. Richard Garriott left Origin shortly afterwards, and parent company EA Games soon shut the studio down, later using the Origin name and a variation of the logo to brand their digital distribution service.

After the shut-down of Origin, Ultima IX became unsupported software despite the many unresolved bugs. Therefore, loyal fans of the series tried to address the biggest complaints and issues themselves; the community at Ultima: The Reconstruction released an unofficial patch to fix the inconsistencies within the Ultima IX storyline, bringing the story more, but not completely, in line with the rest of the series.

Years later, digital video game distributor GOG.com re-released a downloadable version of Ultima IX on August 23, 2012.

In November 2014, the Ultima Codex Community was able to acquire the Ultima IX source code from a former developer for offline archival to prevent permanent loss.

== Reception ==
Reception

Aggregate score
Aggregator	Score
GameRankings	63%

Review scores
Publication	Score
CNET Gamecenter	6/10
Computer Games Strategy Plus	3/5
Computer Gaming World	2.5/5
Eurogamer	5/10
Game Informer	8.75/10
GameFan	55%
GamePro	3/5
GameRevolution	D
GameSpot	6.4/10
GameZone	6.9/10
IGN	6.2/10
Next Generation	4/5
PC Accelerator	4/10
PC Gamer (US)	80%

The game received "mixed or average" reviews according to the review aggregation website GameRankings.

At the time of its release, many fans felt the game was unfinished and not as polished as the earlier Ultimas were. One of the chief criticisms of Ultima IX was that the story did not do justice to the continuity of earlier parts of the series, and in fact, largely ignores it. The game was said to be made to attract a more general gamer audience with little or no knowledge of previous Ultimas, so many facts and events from earlier games are disregarded, while others are altered to suit the plot of Ultima IX, as well as dialogue where the Avatar questions certain aspects of past installments of Ultima that the Avatar should remember, such as the infamous "What's a paladin?" quote. Some fans have found a considerable number of errors in the game.

The game also received plenty of criticism for being launched with numerous bugs.

Drew Hunt of AllGame gave it three-and-a-half stars out of five, calling it "one of the most notable examples imaginable of a game that could have been among the best ever made in its genre if only its release had been held off another half year. With all the bugs gone and the overall game speed increased, any remaining problems would have been virtually insignificant."

The game was commercially unsuccessful, with sales of roughly 75,000 units in the U.S. by August 2000.

The game was a finalist for the "Computer Adventure/Role-Playing Game of the Year" award at the Academy of Interactive Arts & Sciences' 3rd Annual Interactive Achievement Awards, although it ultimately lost to Asheron's Call. The staff of PC Gamer US also nominated the game for their 1999 "Best Roleplaying Game" award, which ultimately went to System Shock 2. They wrote, "The fact is that on a top system with bug patches applied, Ultima IX is one of the best roleplaying games of all time. If it had been released without those bugs, it would have run away with this year's award". The game won GameSpot's 1999 award for "Most Disappointing Game of the Year", and was a runner-up for the "Best Graphics, Artistic Design" award, which went to Rayman 2: The Great Escape.
