= Ultima V: Lazarus =

2005 video game

- Developer: Team Lazarus
- Publisher: Team Lazarus
- Designer: Ian S. Frazier
- Platforms: Windows, Mac OS X
- Release: December 22, 2005
- Genre: Role-playing
- Mode: Single player

Ultima V: Lazarus is a fan-made remake of Ultima V. The game uses Gas Powered Games' Dungeon Siege engine, and that game is required to play the remake. It is an attempt to reconstruct the original title, including an elaborated plot, strategy elements and updated conversational mechanisms to resemble the original 1988 game dialog systems.

== History ==
The developers of Ultima V: Lazarus are known as Team Lazarus. This group is composed of volunteer writers, musicians, artists, and programmers from America, Australia, Austria, Brazil, England, Finland, Germany, Japan, Norway, and Slovenia. Several members of Team Lazarus are professional game designers and many of the developers are also members of UDIC, the Ultima Dragons Internet Chapter.

The director of Ultima V: Lazarus is Ian Frazier, a game designer who moved on to Big Huge Games where he was Lead Designer on Kingdoms of Amalur: Reckoning before shifting to a similar role at BioWare. As a tribute to his efforts, Ultima fans bought for him a crossbow made by David R. Watson, the real world inspiration for the recurring Ultima character Iolo. In an issue of Escapist Magazine he is quoted as saying that Gas Powered Games was "spectacularly helpful," and were "always trying their best to provide tech support."

Lazarus was nearly four years in the making, and the final version of the game for PC, 1.20, was released on April 1, 2006. The Mac version was released on 13 April 2006. The French localised version of Ultima V: Lazarus was released on September 21, 2006. A German version was released on December 23, 2007.

== Differences from the original ==
The original Ultima V game was a stand-alone game for the Apple II, DOS, Atari ST, NES, Amiga & Commodore 64 platforms. Ultima V: Lazarus is a modification to video game Dungeon Siege.

The original game featured a tile-based 2D world to explore, whereas the world of Britannia in Lazarus was entirely re-constructed in 3D. Several spells from the original could not be supported by the new game engine, such as spells that allowed the party to instantly move to a higher or lower level of the dungeon. The "In Por" (Blink) spell was removed from the final patch due to a bug referred to as "Blink Blindness", although a patch to reactivate the spell is featured on the website as an unsupported download. Many objects from the original Ultima V which could be moved, such as chests, barrels, and mirrors, are immovable in Lazarus. Naval combat is also different, as the few NPC ships are immobile, and cannons are absent. Other features from the original game that had to be removed because of engine limitations include whirlpools, the magic carpet, digging up moonstones and usable skiffs.

The developers re-wrote much of the dialog in the game, adding many more quests and choices than were available in the original game. Much of the dialog was enhanced to discuss the philosophy of the virtues system in more detail and giving greater depth to the personalities encountered.

== Gameplay ==
There is at least one more possible ending where the Avatar decides that rather than rescue Lord British, he will ensure the missing monarch's disappearance is permanent.

== Reception ==
Pelit gave the game 90 out of 100 and summarized that "Ultima V: Lazarus is a truly wonderful modernisation of a classic game. Despite the bugginess and a somewhat aged Dungeon Siege engine, Lazarus is a must-download for every Ultima fan. Impressive work in every respect." Inside Mac Games reviewed the remake in 2006.

RPGdot described the game as "a monumental work of love by a dedicated team of primarily amateurs.".

Computer Gaming World praised the game but criticized all the bugs of the early build.

The Games Machine gave it a score of 94%, praising the restyling of the graphics and recomposing of the music.

Hardcore Gaming 101 wrote: "The game looks utterly fantastic, and is essentially a whole new, unofficial and professional-quality Ultima game."
