= Worlds of Ultima: The Savage Empire =

1990 video game

- MS-DOS cover
- Developer: Origin Systems
- Publishers: Origin Systems; Pony Canyon (SNES)
- Producers: Richard Garriott; Jeff Johannigman
- Designer: Steve Beeman
- Writer: Aaron Allston
- Composers: George Sanger; Barry Leitch (SNES)
- Series: Ultima
- Platforms: MS-DOS, Super NES, PC-98, X68000, Windows, Classic Mac OS
- Release: MS-DOS; 1990; X68000; 1993; Super NES: JP: July 28, 1995; Windows, Mac: WW: June 18, 2012 (freeware)
- Genre: Role-playing
- Mode: Single-player

Worlds of Ultima: The Savage Empire is a role-playing video game, part in the Ultima series, published in 1990. It is considered a Worlds of Ultima game, as its setting differs from that of the main series. It uses the same engine as Ultima VI: The False Prophet and Martian Dreams. On June 18, 2012, Electronic Arts released the game as freeware through GOG.com.

== Plot ==
After the events in Ultima VI, the Avatar is transported by a friend's failed experiment with an obsidian "moonstone" to the otherworldly Valley of Eodon, a large jungle-like world filled with various tribes. These tribes have been magically drawn from varying periods and locations in history, such as the aboriginal nations of Mesoamerica and tropical Africa. The valley of Eodon is actually on Earth, but it is inaccessible and unmappable.

At the time of the arrival of the Avatar, the place is under attack from the insect-like Myrmidex. The Avatar needs to understand and master some aspects of their stone-age tribal culture and their "jungle magic" to find a way to bring peace to the valley. The main plot involves getting all thirteen tribes to join in an alliance against the Myrmidex. Each tribe has its own demands before joining, ranging from defeating a Tyrannosaurus rex to recovering their holy statue. This mixture of worlds was created by a huge corrupted moonstone that the Myrmidex possess, which has to be destroyed to prevent it collapsing in instability.

The player commands the Avatar and a party generally consisting of up to four other characters. However, two set events in the game add a character to the party even if this limit has been reached, resulting in a maximum party size of seven characters.

== Release ==
Origin sold a special edition of the game autographed by Lord British. It came with a hint book and T-shirt.

A port of Savage Empire was released in Japan for the Super Famicom, using the game engine from the Super NES version of Ultima VII. The game was localized and planned for a North American release, but that was eventually cancelled.

== Reception ==
=== Personal computer version ===
Jim Trunzo reviewed Worlds of Ultima: The Savage Empire in White Wolf #25 (Feb./March, 1991), rating it a 5 out of 5 and stated that "The game involves numerous quests, puzzles and battles that will enthrall you. It also involves 50+ hours of playing time!"

Dennis Owens reviewed the game for Computer Gaming World, and stated that "compared to any except its own brothers and sisters, The Savage Empire, despite its niggling problems (which show only because of the brilliance with which the entire line shines), must be considered dazzling and successful. Compared to its peers, however, the game presents what may be a disturbing view of a possible trend in the Ultima line: caricature."

Computer Gaming World described Savage Empire as "not too difficult, but occasionally tricky. Good for filling in the hours while you wait for the next real Ultima". The editors of Game Player's PC Strategy Guide presented the game with their 1990 "Best PC Fantasy Role-Playing Game" award. They wrote, "Lushly beautiful graphics, coupled with a fine role-playing interface, evoke those great old 'lost world' tales from the heyday of the pulp magazines."

A screenshot from Savage Empire, played using DOSBox

=== Super Famicom version ===
On release, Famicom Tsūshin gave the Super Famicom version of the game a score of 23 out of 40. GamePro gave it a negative review, citing crude graphics, sparse sound effects, confusing menus, and the trial-and-error involved in combining objects, as well as "the long-winded conversations, confusing subplots, and annoying characters who pop up for seemingly no reason at all." Mike Weigand of Electronic Gaming Monthly stated "These PC-RPG conversions never really did it for me and Savage Empire is no exception. The action here is slow and definitely geared more toward strategy-oriented game players."
