= Ultima: Worlds of Adventure 2: Martian Dreams =

1991 video game

- Cover art
- Developer: Origin Systems
- Publisher: Origin Systems
- Producer: Warren Spector
- Designer: Jeff George
- Composer: Dana Karl Glover
- Platform: DOS
- Release: May 1991
- Genre: Role-playing
- Mode: Single-player

Ultima: Worlds of Adventure 2: Martian Dreams is a role-playing video game, part of the Ultima series, published in 1991, and re-released for Windows and Mac OS via GOG.com in 2012. It uses the same engine as Ultima VI: The False Prophet, as did Worlds of Ultima: The Savage Empire.

== Story ==
After the events in the Worlds of Ultima: The Savage Empire, the Avatar is visited by a strange red-haired woman who gives a book to him and his friend Dr. Spector. The book will be written by Spector himself, and explains how to use the Orb of the Moons to travel through time. Following instructions, the duo ends up in the Victorian Era, where Percival Lowell has set up a space cannon that will launch some volunteers to Mars.

Through an act of sabotage, the cannon is fired during the 1893 World's Columbian Exposition in Chicago, with several dozen famous people and leaders of the time on board. A second cannon is prepared to find and recover the people in the first, who are stranded on Mars.

It turns out that Mars had an extensive civilization based on plants. Most monsters the player encounters are so-called "plantimals", such as the Jumping Bean and the Planther. Mars has cities and canals, although the civilization is in ruins, so the player's first tasks are restoring the world power station, and melting enough of the polar caps (with a solar lens) to fill the canals.

Some of the people appear to have gone insane after using a device called the Dream Machine. What in fact happened was that, after massive soil poisoning, the original Martians had gone into a sort of alternate dimension called "dreamspace" to preserve themselves. Those people using the Dream Machine found themselves trapped in dreamspace, while the Martians took over their bodies. A large part of the game is spent visiting various people's nightmares and clearing them up.

Eventually, robotic bodies can be created for the Martians, since their plantamal bodies will not grow. After a showdown with the evil Raxachk, who caused the soil pollution in the first place, all Victorians can once more go home.

== Reception ==
Computer Gaming World's Scorpia in 1991 liked Martian Dreams's Victorian setting, but criticized travel as "tedious". The magazine stated that the game was really an adventure pretending to be an RPG, with combat almost completely disassociated from the story, and concluded that it would most appeal to those who prefer other activities to fighting. Peter Olafson was more positive, calling it "an epic adventure ... that has all the depth and complexity of the Ultima series" while accessible to new adventurers. A review by Scorpia in 1993 was also positive, approving of the storyline. She concluded that "the game requires patience and careful attention to detail, but is otherwise enjoyable".

A screenshot from Martian Dreams, played using DOSBox
