= Ultima: Runes of Virtue =

1991 video game

- North American cover art
- Developer: Origin Systems
- Publishers: JP: Pony Canyon; NA: FCI
- Producer: Jeff Johannigman
- Designers: David Shapiro, Gary Scott Smith
- Artists: Amanda Dee, Denis Loubet
- Composers: Amanda Dee, George Sanger
- Series: Ultima
- Platform: Game Boy
- Release: JP: December 14, 1991; NA: April 1992
- Genre: Role-playing
- Mode: Single-player

Ultima: Runes of Virtue a spin-off from the Ultima series released for the Game Boy in 1991. Runes of Virtue is Richard Garriott's favorite non-PC Ultima game because it was built from the ground up as a Game Boy game, unlike previous console Ultima games which were ports from the PC. A sequel, Ultima: Runes of Virtue II, was released in 1993.

== Gameplay ==
The player character can be chosen from four different ones: Mariah the Mage, Iolo the Bard, Dupre the Fighter, or Shamino the Ranger. The player's objective is to recover the eight Runes of Virtue that were stolen by the Black Knight. These runes are hidden in caves scattered across Britannia, filled with various monsters and puzzles. The game is depicted from a top-down perspective similar to Gauntlet.

The player can assign any item in the inventory to either the button "A" or "B", that represent the two hands of the character. Two years later, The Legend of Zelda: Link's Awakening would use the same inventory/control system.

== Reception ==
Reception

Review scores
| Publication | Score |
|---|---|
| Aktueller Software Markt | 10/12 |
| GB Action | 79% |
| Play Time | 50% |
| Power Play | 54% |

GamePro said that "Runes is a standard fantasy scavenger hunt with some virtue, but no surprises." Nintendo Power said that Runes of Virtue rivals the scope and excitement of The Legend of Zelda. GB Action called the game "[p]unishing but compelling".
