= Ultima: Runes of Virtue II =

1990s video game series

- Game Boy version cover
- Developer: Origin Systems
- Publishers: JP: Pony Canyon; NA: FCI; JP: Electronic Arts Victor (SNES)
- Producer: Alan Gardner
- Designer: Gary Scott Smith
- Programmer: Gary Scott Smith
- Artist: Terry Manderfeld
- Composers: Marc Schaefgen; Martin Galway
- Series: Ultima
- Platforms: Game Boy, SNES
- Release: Game Boy: JP: 19 November 1993; NA: March 1994; SNES: JP: 17 June 1994; NA: 1994
- Genre: Role-playing
- Modes: Single-player, Multiplayer

Ultima: Runes of Virtue II is a 1993 video game developed by Origin Systems for the Game Boy and Super Nintendo Entertainment System and published by Pony Canyon and FCI. The game is the sequel to the 1991 Game Boy title of the same name and the second Ultima game to be released on a handheld console. Upon release, the game received average reviews, with critics praising the additions, including new animations, larger scope, and cutscenes, as an improvement to the previous game, but found the visual presentation of the game to be lacking.

== Gameplay ==
Gameplay in Runes of Virtue involves exploration of dungeons to solve puzzles and defeat monsters to obtain items to progress the game.

Runes of Virtue II is a role-playing game in which players are summoned by Lord British through a moongate and tasked to rescue Lord Tholden, the mayor of Britain, and other characters, who have been kidnapped by the Black Knight. Players explore the land of Britannia to fight monsters and solve puzzles in caverns and dungeons throughout the world. Puzzles are completed by interacting with objects in the dungeon, including hitting switches, moving objects, or defeating monsters. Players select one of four characters: the ranger Shamino, the mage Mariah, the bard Iolo and the soldier Dupre. They engage in combat with enemies by using weapons in their hand, which can be changed using the inventory screen, and new weapons are collected throughout the game. Some items are magic items, conferring special abilities, such as restoring health, moving faster, or walking through walls, at the cost of points to the player's magic meter. The Game Boy version of the game features two-player multiplayer using the Game Link Cable.

== Reception ==
Reception

Review scores
| Publication | Score |
|---|---|
| Game Informer | 7.5/10 |
| GamePro | 3.5/5 |
| Nintendo Power | 3.5/5 |
| Total! | 4.25/6 |

Runes of Virtue II received average reviews upon release. Reviewers for Game Informer praised the game as a "brilliant use of the Game Boy in a fantasy role-play" due to the game's choices and gameplay options, animated sequences, and the "variety of objects and characters". Describing the game as "bigger and better" than its predecessor, Nintendo Power praised its "involving" [sic] gameplay, cutscenes and save system, but expressed that it featured "small and confusing" graphics and was a "very complex game that isn't for everyone". Reviewing the SNES version, the publication praised the game's "good depth", "interesting story", and conveyance of a "good feeling of exploring a vast world", although critiquing the game's "awkward" overhead perspective. Nintendo Life praised the game for being "much larger in scope" due to the "larger, more challenging dungeons", multiplayer options, explorable settlements, although stated the game "looks rather rough and feels a little out of place when compared to the best Japanese examples of the genre". GamePro highlighted the game's combination of role-playing and "solid" puzzle mechanics as an improvement on the previous game, but found the game "doesn't play particularly fast", stating "the graphics are shrimpy and the music and sound effects are repetitive".
