= Ultima Forever: Quest for the Avatar =

2013 video game

- Developers: Mythic Entertainment; Escalation Studios
- Publisher: Electronic Arts
- Platform: iOS
- Release: August 7, 2013
- Genre: Action role-playing game
- Mode: Multiplayer

Ultima Forever: Quest for the Avatar was a free-to-play, cross-platform, online, action role-playing game developed by Mythic Entertainment and Escalation Studios and published by Electronic Arts. It was formally a part of the Ultima series. Information was previously released by BioWare in mid-2011 and more information was released on July 11, 2011. It was officially announced at San Diego Comic-Con on July 12, 2012 and it was fully released for iOS on August 7, 2013. The game was shut down on August 29, 2014.

== Gameplay ==
We took Ultima IV, with all of its ethical moral choice, which was innovative for its time, and updated it for the next generation.

— Kate Flack

The game was based upon Ultima IV, but was considered by Mythic to be an "action role-playing game". Ultima Forever included both online play with a group, as well as a single-player mode. Unlike Ultima IV, there was a Lady British character instead of Lord British. This was due to Richard Garriott retaining the trademark rights after he left Electronic Arts. Mythic emphasized that the Virtues from the Ultima series would play an important part.

Ultima Forever featured a top-down isometric point of view, with "hand-painted backgrounds and 3D characters."

== Development ==
On March 31, 2011, an image of a presentation given by Paul Barnett was leaked. The official Twitter account became active on April 4, 2011, and was discovered by the Ultima community at the end of May 2011. The official website was registered on March 17, 2010 and went live on June 2, 2011.

On June 11, 2012, Mythic Entertainment General Manager Eugene Evans revealed at the Develop Conference that a new free-to-play online was going to be announced on July 12, 2012. Later that day, the official Facebook page became active, and the official website was updated to a new design, with a brief description of the game, and a link for Beta applicants.

Paul Barnett revealed on Twitter that the game would be announced at San Diego Comic-Con.

== Reception ==
Reception for the game ranged from mixed to negative. Most reviewers criticized the microtransaction system used.

Forbes gave it a 6 out of 10 rating.

Touch Arcade gave it three out of five stars.

Eurogamer gave it a rating of 2 out of 10, calling it 'a game built for idiots, a Cow Clicker with a beard'.
