= Ultima: Escape from Mt. Drash =

1983 video game

- Developer: Sierra On-Line
- Publisher: Sierra On-Line
- Designer: Keith Zabalaoui
- Series: Ultima
- Platform: VIC-20
- Release: 1983
- Genre: Role-playing
- Mode: Single-player

Ultima: Escape from Mt. Drash is a role-playing video game published for the VIC-20 home computer by Sierra On-Line in 1983. The game only loosely ties into the Ultima series.

== Plot ==
Creatures called "garrintrots" have imprisoned the player in Mt. Drash, and the player's task is to escape the dungeons. Mt. Drash is the name of a dungeon in Ultima I, and the name "garrintrots" is a pun on Richard Garriott's surname.

== Gameplay ==
The game is a series of randomly generated three-dimensional generated dungeons, and the goal is to destroy all monsters that stand in way and exit to the next level. There is a time limit. The game doesn't employ custom graphics, but rather uses the VIC-20's standard set of graphical characters to draw the game scene. The game uses the 4-voice sound capabilities of the MOS Technology VIC video chip in the VIC-20 to provide background music.

== Development ==
The game was written by Keith Zabalaoui for Sierra On-Line in 1983. Sierra, which had published Ultima II, named the game an Ultima to improve its sales. Richard Garriott gave permission to the company and Zabalaoui—a friend who had worked on previous games for him—to do so. Sierra was skeptical of the game's appeal given the declining VIC-20 market and need for memory expansion, and only manufactured the few thousand copies needed to meet contractual requirements, with one advertisement in the July 1983 Compute! describing it as "A real-time, fantastic adventure" and part of the SierraVenture series. Sierra even denied the game ever existed, until Zabalaoui confirmed it actually was finished and was shipped to retailers. Further proof can be found in the Sierra On-Line Consumer Price List for First Quarter 1984 where the game is listed at $19.95 with a stock number of 40245202. Approximately 3000 units were made, though exact numbers are not available.

The game was written in Commodore BASIC with assembly language routines for faster animation of graphics and to handle the background music. Unlike most of the more popular VIC-20 games, it wasn't published as a ROM cartridge but rather on cassette tape. Due to the complexity of the source code and the unusual (by VIC-20 standards) length of the game, as well as the fact that unlike a cartridge game all of it had to fit in RAM, an 8 K or 16 K RAM memory expansion cartridge was required to be installed in the VIC-20 before running the game, further limiting the target audience.

Details surrounding the game were very vague. It was believed the game was a cartridge, when it was released for the Datasette. One of the rumors about the game was that Sierra sold a minimal number of the games, enough to break even, then buried the remaining stock at the foot of a mountain, similar to the Atari video game burial. A retailer near Vancouver, B.C. dumped unsold software over a cliff, and this is where one of the only known complete copies was eventually found. Many falsely believed that Sierra named the game Ultima without Garriott's knowledge or authorization.

== Legacy ==
In recent years, the game has been sought after by collectors. First copies of the game were discovered and announced in 2000. The first online auction of a copy was in September 2003. Since then, there have been some very rare sightings, but due to high demand, there have been quite a few counterfeit games on the market. The first complete, rediscovered copy of the game sold on eBay in March 2004 for US$3,605 to collector Peter Olafson.
