= Sheri Graner Ray =

American video game developer

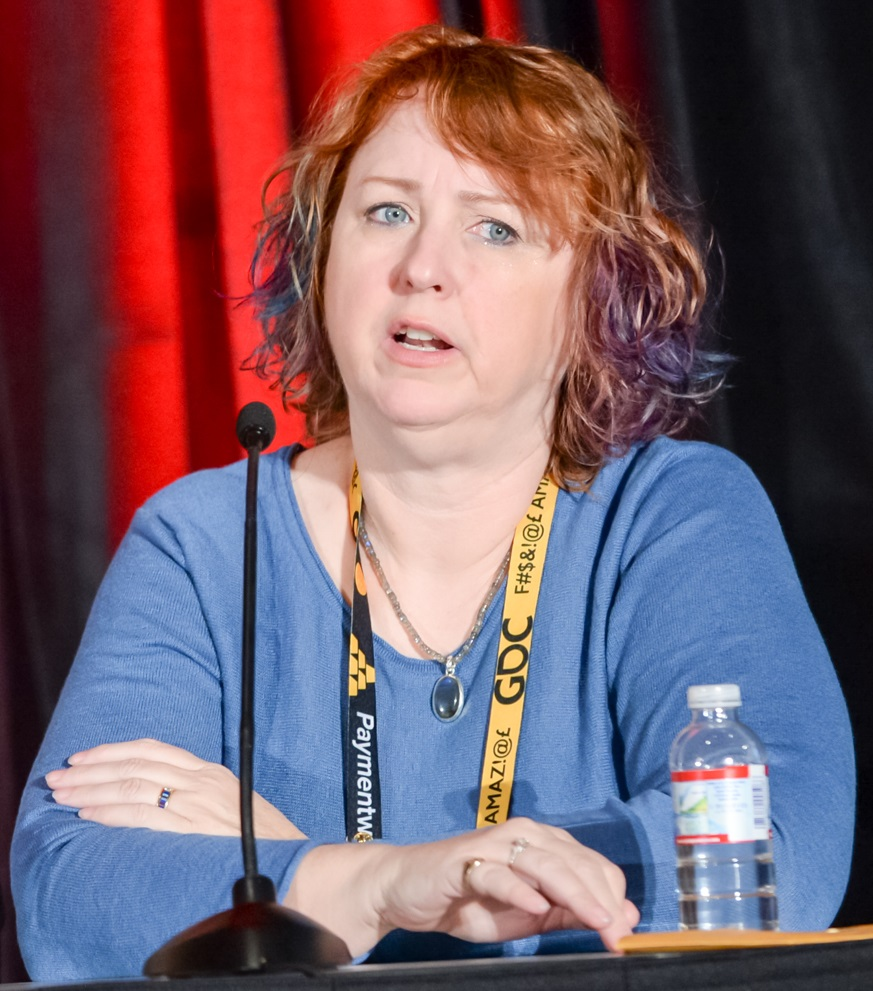
Sheri Graner Ray at the 2015 Game Developers Conference

Sheri Graner Ray is an American computer game designer. Active since 1990, she has worked for such companies as Electronic Arts, Origin Systems, Sony Online Entertainment, and Cartoon Network, and has worked on such licenses as Star Wars Galaxies, Ultima, and Nancy Drew. She is author of the book Gender Inclusive Game Design-Expanding the Market and is the computer game industry's leading expert on the subject of gender and computer games.

The Hollywood Reporter named Ray one of the 100 most influential women in the video game industry in 2004. In 2005 she received the International Game Developers Association Award for Community Contribution at the Game Developers Choice Awards for her work on women's interests in the video game industry. She served as Chair of the Steering Committee for Women In Games International, a non-profit organization she co-founded.

She currently lives in Austin, Texas with her husband, Tim.
