= Ultima VII Part Two: Serpent Isle =

1993 video game

- Developer: Origin Systems
- Publisher: Origin Systems
- Directors: Richard Garriott; Bill Armintrout
- Producer: Warren Spector
- Designer: Bill Armintrout
- Writers: Raymond Benson; Bill Armintrout; Sheri Hobbs
- Composers: Dana Karl Glover; Marc Schaefgen
- Series: Ultima
- Platform: MS-DOS
- Release: March 25, 1993
- Genre: Role-playing game
- Mode: Single player

Ultima VII Part Two: Serpent Isle is a role-playing video game released in 1993 as part of the core Ultima series, its story beginning eighteen months after the conclusion of Ultima VII: The Black Gate. In Serpent Isle, the Avatar follows Batlin to the eponymous land called Serpent Isle, finding three city-states founded by those who left Britannia generations before and ancient ruins from a still-older lost civilization that was there long before them.

This is the first game in the main Ultima series to take place in its entirety outside Britannia as it has been known since Ultima III. It is also more linear than the earlier parts—unlike the earlier games, where the order in which quests were completed was of little concern, the new approach makes it possible to give the game a more carefully plotted storyline, while at the same time somewhat limiting the player's choice. Additionally, there are few optional sub-quests; every objective somehow ties into the main quest.

== Plot ==
=== Backstory ===
Back in Ultima I: The First Age of Darkness, one section of the game world was known as "The Lands of Danger and Despair". Shamino, a recurring character in the Ultima series, was a ruling lord here. The Lands of Danger and Despair vanished after the conclusion of Ultima I and became Serpent Isle, separated from Sosaria, as the world of Britannia was called before Ultima IV.

The original inhabitants of Serpent Isle, the Ophidians, had a culture where serpents played a central role. They eventually became polarized as the forces of Order and Chaos, respectively, and fought a great war that destroyed their culture and left their cities and temples in ruins. Order "won" the war, destroying the Chaos Serpent, but thereby upsetting the natural balance to the point where the entire universe is unraveling. (It turns out that the "Great Earth Serpent" that guarded Exodus's fortress in Ultima III was actually the Balance Serpent that Exodus had ripped from the void, triggering the war between Chaos and Order in the first place.)

Much later, Serpent Isle was re-settled by humans who had left Sosaria voluntarily, or who had been exiled. An alternate name for Serpent Isle is "New Sosaria", a reference to the original homeland of these settlers. Many of them referred to Lord British as "Beast British", and had a very low opinion of him. After he united the lands, and with the establishment of the eight virtues, those unhappy with his rule fled to Serpent Isle. Unlike Britannia, which has eight cities representing the eight virtues of the Avatar, Serpent Isle has three city-states, each with their own beliefs, which are warped versions of the Britannian principles of Truth, Love and Courage:

- In the city of Moonshade, mages rule, and "mundanes" are regarded as an inferior servant-class. Instead of truth, they strive for power.
- Those from the city of Fawn champion beauty above all else, instead of Love.
- The Monitor warrior-culture is ostensibly based on knightly courage, but in truth is rife with feuds, intrigue and betrayal.

Serpent Isle has essentially the same map layout as the former Lands of Danger and Despair, though this might not be immediately obvious to players. The formerly separate towns of East and West Montor have merged to become the city of Monitor; the large Sleeping Bull Inn has taken the place of the village of Bulldozer; the village of Gorlab vanished in the newly formed Gorlab Swamp (an important plot element); and the ruined Ophidian cities of Skullcrusher and Spinebreaker, apparently named after the mountain-chains in which they lie, are located where dungeon mazes of the same name were found in the earlier game.

=== Game storyline ===
Eighteen months after the destruction of the eponymous Black Gate at the conclusion of Ultima VII: The Black Gate (and six months after the Guardian attempted to trap the Avatar and the whole of Castle Britannia in a blackrock sphere on the anniversary of that event in Ultima Underworld II: Labyrinth of Worlds) it is discovered that the Guardian ordered his right-hand man Batlin to follow Iolo's wife Gwenno, who went to explore Serpent Isle. Lord British sends the Avatar and three of his companions—Sir Dupre the knight, Shamino the ranger (who was once a ruling lord on what is now Serpent Isle several centuries ago) and Iolo the bard—to Serpent Isle in pursuit of Batlin. The journey entails travelling into an arctic zone where two serpent pillars emerge from the sea; upon moving between the pillars, the ship is teleported away to Serpent Isle.

The main overhead view of Serpent Isle (Exult version). This is the beginning of the game where the Avatar and companions are shipwrecked.

At the beginning of the game, the expedition's ship is beached at Serpent Isle by magical storms. Soon afterwards they lose most of their equipment to another magical storm of a kind later called teleport storm that exchanges equipment for seemingly random items, such as a magical helmet exchanged for a fur cap. It turns out that the items switched locations and that the items gained thus are leads to the location of the missing pieces of equipment, such as a penguin egg indicating that the item it has swapped places with will be found among the penguins in the frozen north.

Two overarching plotlines exist within the game: the expedition must reclaim their equipment, as many of the items are required to solve puzzles and subquests in the game; and they must explore Serpent Isle and discover its history to understand the reasons for the magical storms that will destroy the land. Over the course of his adventures, the Avatar and his companions visit the ruins of the lost Ophidian cities, witness the extinction of the peaceful Gwani, and learn that Iolo's wife Gwenno was killed (though later manage to have her revived). Lord Shamino's ruined castle is also visited, and his and his dead fiancée's tragic backstory is revealed.

The storyline can roughly be divided into three parts.

==== Chasing Batlin ====
Exploring Serpent Isle while tracking Batlin (and Gwenno), the expedition learns that the magical storms, which are gradually getting worse, indicate that the world is unraveling. The apocalypse is drawing near, and when it turns out that a lighthouse on Serpent Isle was exchanged for Britannia's Royal Mint by teleport storms it becomes apparent that the problem is not limited to Serpent Isle, but is affecting Britannia as well and possibly the entirety of creation. (At one point in the game, the Avatar visits the magical dream world where he meets Lord British who confirms that similar magical storms began ravaging Britannia shortly after the Avatar left.)

The Avatar learns that Batlin is trying to capture three Ophidian demi-gods known as the Banes, but Batlin always remains several steps ahead and the Avatar does not arrive in time to stop him. Batlin was hoping to tie the Banes to his own service to attain god-like powers, betraying the Guardian, but they escape, slay Batlin and possess the Avatar's companions who in turn proceed to devastate the three cities and kill most of the inhabitants.

==== Fighting the Banes ====
After this happens, the Avatar must find a means in the post-apocalyptic Serpent Isle to track down the three Banes (Anarchy, Wantonness and Insanity) and free his companions from their influence. In the process of doing so, Gwenno is resurrected.

Many parts of the plot were cut for this section. In the game itself, the Banes had occupied the cities and simply killed most of the population of Serpent Isle before withdrawing to a castle. The Avatar must track them down and defeat them. However, in the original plot documents of the game, the Banes take over each town instead of simply killing the inhabitants and many subplots are concerned with their cruel rule.

==== Restoring balance ====
Finally, after defeating the Banes and rescuing his companions, the Avatar must use his knowledge about the ancient Ophidian culture to ascend to the position of Hierophant of Balance (through exploring their ruined cities and shrines, and performing a variety of rituals) to ultimately restore the lost Chaos Serpent, to balance the warring forces of Order and Chaos. It turns out that a living soul must be sacrificed in the process. The Avatar volunteers, but Sir Dupre, driven by guilt for the deeds he committed while possessed by the Bane of Wantonness, insists on sacrificing himself instead and hurls himself into the crematorium.

In the end sequence, the Avatar is teleported into the void to face the Serpents, who thank him and affirm that order is restored; then suddenly, the Guardian's giant hand appears and grabs the Avatar, abducting him to (yet) another world. (Ultima VIII: Pagan continues the story from there.)

==== Original plot ====
Many elements of the game's plot were cut from the final release, due to the deadline imposed by Electronic Arts. Most of the cut plot elements were from the second half of the game after Batlin's death, although a few ideas from earlier parts of the game were also removed. Many of these elements can still be found in the final game's data files, and some remnants still exist in the game itself.

== Gameplay ==
Serpent Isle uses a very similar engine to that of Ultima VII: The Black Gate. However, it contains an improved inventory system. Character sprites are much bigger, as they’re scanned actual images of actors. One major improvement in Serpent Isle over Ultima VII is the introduction of a paper doll inventory. This means that when you put on any armour, weapon or clothing item you’ll see your character sprite automatically refresh to show you what you have on.

The battles are played out in real-time with a point-and-click system. You control the Avatar while the rest of them will act automatically using the AI. You have the option of opening a combat window where you can give all your party tactical instructions. There is also a targeting feature that helps when you need to click on moving characters quickly. You can use Hot Keys on the keyboard to quickly open your spell book, map etc.

The game also has a day/night system. Characters have to eat and drink. Companions will complain if they cannot eat what is in their packs. Players can increase their Strength, Dexterity, Intelligence and Combat skills by using training points. These are gained when you level up with paid trainers located at settlements.

Unlike the first four games in the series, there are no complaints from companions for stealing or killing. However, if other characters see the party steal or kill then there may be a penalty. As Serpent Isle isn’t focused on being virtuous like Britannia, the guards will occasionally ask for bribes from the Avatar if they catch them stealing or using violence. Bribing guards was last possible in the series in Ultima III.

== Development ==
Since most of the game's code was recycled from The Black Gate, it was decided not to call it Ultima VIII; Richard Garriott had stated in interviews around 1988 that no two Ultimas shared the same source code, unlike the then-competing The Bard's Tale series, and he may have felt bound by this statement.

A clue-book was published for the game, titled Balancing the Scales.

The game was re-released in 2012 on GOG.com with support for Windows and macOS via DOSBox.

== The Silver Seed expansion ==
The Silver Seed expansion adds the Silver Seed story arc to the game, in which the party visits a subterranean keep in the ancient civilization of Serpent Isle (centuries in the past, during the war between the two sects of Ophidians). The Avatar is given an amulet by the Xenkan Monks when he or she first visits Monk Isle (either by death or by physically going there), and after using this amulet at one of the Serpent Gates, the subquest begins.

Powerful magic items, including a keyring, a ring of unlimited reagents, a magic axe and an enchanted belt can be found in this area and in nearby dungeons. In later releases of the game, the expansion pack was included, and both games and expansions were released as The Complete Ultima VII.

The Silver Seed expansion was not properly finished due to a rushed release by Electronic Arts; the story told in the expansion does not properly conclude, nor does it seem to connect with the larger plot of Serpent Isle outside of a few incidental framing elements. It is broadly concerned with acquiring and planting a magical silver seed to maintain the balance that holds the world of Serpent Isle together.

The Silver Seed does attempt to address the issue of the population being killed off after the Banes are released; if completed after this takes place, Karnax will inform the Avatar that everyone killed by the Banes will be resurrected once Balance is restored, in the conclusion of the game itself.

== Items included in the box ==
Like other Ultima games, Serpent Isle and its expansion pack originally came with cloth maps, and in-universe manuals. It did not, however, come with a trinket. Ultima VII: Complete Edition (1993) included all the items while The Complete Ultima VII CD (1994) included everything except the cloth maps which were replaced with paper maps. Most other compilations did not include the trinkets and came with electronic versions of the documentation.

- Ultima VII Part Two: Serpent Isle: Cloth map of Serpent Isle; Beyond the Serpent Pillars book
- Ultima VII Part Two: The Silver Seed: "Silver Seed Play Guide" pamphlet

Serpent Isle was released in English and Spanish.

== Reception ==
Reception

Review score
Publication	Score
Electronic Entertainment	7 out of 10

Computer Gaming World's Scorpia in 1993 stated that Serpent Isle was much more complex than The Black Gate, but with "some major problems", criticizing the inventory system and need to manually feed characters, slow disk access, and several puzzles. She concluded that "Serpent Isle is a good story gone wrong. While the main plotline is solid, execution of it is inadequate ... too many poorly-designed 'puzzles' ... Origin needs to re-examine Ultima IV for a refresher course [on] how open game design and logical plot connections are supposed to work." Cnet stated that "Serpent Isle, the continuation of Ultima VII, is often considered the best Ultima ever made. Though its look is mostly borrowed from Ultima VII, Serpent Isle offers a huge quest and some of the most fascinating characters and situations ever to be found in a role-playing game." The Free Lance-Star stated that "Ultima VII Part II, The Serpent Isle, is yet another improvement in the series, technologically, visually, and in terms of story line." Assuring readers that prior experience with the series was not necessary, PC Magazine said that "Enhanced sound and speed make this the best Ultima yet".

Scorpia only recommended Silver Seed to those who would play or replay Serpent Isle. She stated that "the storyline of the game doesn't amount to much", noting that planting the silver seed in the past apparently did not change the present, and that the included walkthrough indicated that Electronic Arts wanted players to quickly return to the main Serpent Isle plot with the expansion's new items. Scorpia reported that various improvements made gameplay "less of a hassle", citing the keyring, lockpicking, and food and reagent handling, but warned of various new bugs. She concluded that "while Silver Seed isn't a terrific game in itself and has a few problems, it will certainly make playing Serpent Isle a little more enjoyable".

In 1994, PC Gamer US named Serpent Isle the 13th best computer game ever. The editors wrote that it "marks the pinnacle of what has become one of the most popular game cycles ever", and they considered it "a must for every PC gamer". The same year, PC Gamer UK named Serpent Isle and The Black Gate collectively the 39th best computer game of all time. The editors called it "absolutely enormous – we are talking months of play here – with complex, absorbing and involving multiple sub-plots and storylines. Garriott's commitment to creating a complete fantasy world has been fully realised here."
