= Dana Karl Glover =

American trumpet player and music composer

Dana Karl Glover (born September 8, 1958 in Los Angeles) is an American trumpet player and music composer for video games. He is also stated as Dr. Dana or Karl James. Glover wrote the music to video games like Wing Commander II: Vengeance of the Kilrathi, Ultima VII: The Black Gate, or Ultima VII Part Two: Serpent Isle. In addition he directed, produced and wrote the music to the short horror movie Shadows in 2007.
