= Iolo =

Iolo is a diminutive of Iorwerth, a Welsh name. It may refer to:

- Iolo Goch (1320–1398), Welsh bard
- Iolo Ceredig Jones (1947–2021), Welsh chess player
- Iolo Morganwg (1747–1826), Welsh poet, antiquarian, and literary forger
- Iolo Aneurin Williams (1890–1962), British writer, journalist and Liberal Party politician
- Iolo Williams (born 1962), Welsh television presenter

== See also ==
- Iolo FitzOwen, character in the computer game series Ultima
