= Ultima VII: The Black Gate =

1992 video game

- Developer: Origin Systems
- Publishers: Origin Systems: NA: Origin Systems; UK: Mindscape SNES; JP: Pony Canyon; NA: FCI
- Designer: Richard Garriott
- Programmer: Ken Demarest
- Artist: Jeff Dee
- Writer: Raymond Benson
- Composers: Dana Karl Glover; Kirk Winterrowd; Herman Miller; Raymond Benson
- Series: Ultima
- Platforms: MS-DOS, Super NES
- Release: MS-DOS: NA: 17 April 1992; Super NES: JP: 18 November 1994; NA: November 1994
- Genre: Role-playing
- Mode: Single player

Ultima VII: The Black Gate is the seventh installment of the Ultima series of role-playing video games. It was published in April 1992 for MS-DOS by Origin Systems. The player returns as The Avatar, a would-be paragon of moral virtue who faces down many dangers and deceptions in order to cleanse the medieval fantasy world of Britannia of assorted plots and schemes, monster infestations, and the undermining of crown authority. A Super NES conversion was released in 1994.

The Black Gate was critically acclaimed and commercially successful, being widely lauded as a high point in the series and is also regarded as one of the best video games ever created. In an interview with GameSpot, Richard Garriott stated that Ultima VII "was the most masterfully executed of the Ultima series". He has also often stated that the game was, along with Ultima IV, his own favorite installment overall.

== Gameplay ==
Ultima VII introduced major changes in the Ultima series. The most serious alteration is that as far as the player is concerned, the world is no longer tile and grid-based; tiles are still used internally (in a largely improved way where the tiles themselves are smaller and frequently grouped), but they no longer affect character and monster movement or the item placement the same way. The maps are also more visibly multi-layered, and objects and things can be stacked on top of each other. This can also affect movement, and be part of puzzles; some places are inaccessible unless the player stacks items to form stairs. A striking visual change is that the gameworld now takes up the entire screen in its original DOS environment, while previous Ultimas used a substantial portion of the screen for text, dialogue, buttons, icons, and the like. While a top-down view is preserved, elements such as building walls and characters (including the Avatar and companions) are depicted at a leftward angle, creating a pseudo-isometric appearance.

The game is the first in the series that is entirely mouse-driven, with optional keyboard hotkeys for some common actions. This is in contrast to earlier entries that are entirely keyboard-driven, and to Ultima VI, which supplements keyboard commands with on-screen command icons. While in Ultima VI, the player has to specifically use a "move" command to move an item from place to place, or "drop" to drop it on the ground, in Ultima VII, items are simply dragged and dropped to their desired locations. While the game can be played entirely with a keyboard, doing so is very difficult, and in-game characters recommend the player use a mouse.

Ultima VII introduces Graphical User Menu Pop-ups ("gumps"), which are on-screen representations of containers, later employed in Ultima VIII, Ultima IX and Ultima Online. For example, clicking on a drawer or backpack will show the contents of the container on screen, allowing the items within arranged freely with the mouse. Gumps are also used for books, scrolls, the spellbook, the status display, maps, and character equipment management; double-clicking on the Avatar opens his or her inventory, after which the inventories of other party characters can be opened by double-clicking them in turn. In Ultima VII Part Two: Serpent Isle, the inventory view uses a paper doll concept: equipping items will change the character inventory display to show the worn or held items in place.

Another major change from earlier entries is that the game is completely real-time, and only pauses when the inventory, the menu, or a dialogue is open, significantly affecting combat. The combat system is altered accordingly: every party character is controlled by artificial intelligence (AI), and the desired behavior can be chosen for each character (for example, stronger characters can be ordered to autonomously waylay the toughest opponents, while more vulnerable characters will keep their distance), and there is also the option to choose manual targeting for the Avatar. Though the combat is real-time, the player can take their time in performing certain actions – for example, the game pauses when the player prepares to use an item from their backpack. The AI occasionally executes some self-defeating moves (such as firing a triple crossbow into a crowd of allies), but it saves the player the need to micromanage up to eight different characters in battle. The AI can decide on its own to change what weapon a party member has been equipped with if there is a different weapon in their inventory. At times, the AI will make a party member drop their weapon to the ground before retreating.

Dialogue in Ultima VII, taken in Exult

Ultima VII: The Black Gate is the first game in the mainline Ultima series to use dialogue trees. The first trilogy only allows simple interaction while the second trilogy uses a keyword-based dialogue. Ultima VII retains the old keywords themselves, but uses a dialogue tree where dialogue options are picked with a mouse rather than entered on keyboard; in previous games, whether at random or due to having external knowledge about the game, the player can enter keywords and trigger dialog and events before they are intended to be. In Ultima VII, the keywords only appear when they are actually learned beforehand in the game due to the plot – for example, "thief caught" dialogue option won't actually appear until a thief is actually caught.

=== Game world ===
The gameworld of Ultima VII is highly interactive: virtually everything not nailed to the ground and not excessively heavy can be moved, taken, or interacted with in some way. It is possible, for instance, to bake bread, to forge weapons, to play musical instruments, to paint a self-portrait, and to change a baby's swaddling by dragging and dropping things in the game world. The Avatar and his companions, if not fed regularly, will complain of hunger pangs and severe thirst, and will even perish if these matters are not attended to eventually. If they come across a disgusting or gruesome scene, they may groan and vomit; sufficient intake of strong alcoholic beverages will also result in visible nausea.

Ultima VII allows free exploration of the game world, featuring a main plot and several other major subquests and tasks for the player to complete. It is a markedly open-ended game, where following the main plotline is inessential to the purposes of enjoyment, exploration, and character advancement – once the player is free from their starting location of Trinsic, a walled city. The Black Gate is highly nonlinear; although there is a linear storyline, this is complemented by the ability to explore the map in any order when coupled with the many subquests.

Ultima VII features less emphasis on behaving virtuously than other installments in the Ultima series. The Avatar can steal and murder to his heart's content, without making the game impossible to finish. However, the game simulates a society that sticks to some of the virtues: NPCs – either the party members or the people of Britannia – react to killings of innocents and stealing whenever they became aware of it; party members may leave the group if they witness too much bloodshed and larceny and will refuse to join the party until the player redeems themself. They may even openly revolt and attack the Avatar if he goes about committing wanton crimes incessantly. The Guardian will sometimes appear and mock the player after they commit a criminal act. This makes sense in light of the final installment's revelation that The Guardian is in fact the alter-ego, the subconscious mirror, to the Avatar himself.

The Black Gate features a deed system, where the Avatar must purchase and carry a title to any horse-and-carriage or ship that he or she wishes to board. The Serpent Isle does not have this deed system; instead, ships, barges, and the Serpent Gates are all triggered by the plot.

== Plot ==
The game begins with what appears to be the game introduction on the Avatar's own computer screen. Suddenly, the screen is filled with static, and a red creature who calls himself The Guardian proclaims:

Avatar! Know that Britannia has entered into a new age of enlightenment! Know that the time has finally come for the one true Lord of Britannia to take His place at the head of His people! Under my guidance, Britannia will flourish. And all the people shall rejoice and pay homage to their new ... Guardian! Know that you, too, shall kneel before me, Avatar. You, too, shall soon acknowledge my authority - for I shall be your companion ... your provider ... and your master!

The Orb of the Moons glows, and the Avatar finds that a red moongate has appeared behind the house. The Avatar thus returns to Britannia through the moongate, and arrives in Trinsic, where he meets Iolo. Iolo tells him that two centuries have passed since he left. The whole town is shocked due to a ritualistic murder that occurred the preceding night - the body of the blacksmith Christopher was found in the stable. Finnigan, Mayor of Trinsic, asks the Avatar to investigate the incident.

In Trinsic, the Avatar gets to meet several members of a new religious organization called the Fellowship. Eventually, in Britain, he meets Batlin, one of the founders of the Fellowship. He also meets Lord British, who urges the Avatar to join the Fellowship, which, according to him, has done a lot of good things. It also turns out most of the mages of the realm have gone completely insane without any good explanation, and their magic doesn't work as it should.

Most of the game is composed of the Avatar's investigation of the Fellowship and the Trinsic murders. During the game, the Avatar finds more and more clues that implicate the Fellowship in shady dealings; more murders appear on the way, and the Avatar himself goes undercover by entering the Fellowship. His quest takes him to most of the cities and towns of Britannia, including Minoc, a destroyed Skara Brae run by a lich, Yew, Moonglow and Buccaneer's Den.

The Avatar eventually learns of an astronomical alignment of importance that is supposed to happen very soon, and about the three evil Generators that the Guardian has created, which have been causing most of the problems of the land. After destroying them, he and his companions follow several leads to the Isle of Avatar, where members of the Fellowship are waiting. The Fellowship has fashioned a black moongate out of blackrock on this island to allow the Guardian to enter Britannia when the astronomical alignment happens.

The Avatar confronts the Fellowship members and defeats them. As the astronomical alignment begins and the Guardian starts to loom behind the moongate, the Avatar destroys the gate just in time, preventing the Guardian from entering Britannia. As the moongates had been rendered useless by the destruction of one of the generators, the Avatar has to remain in Britannia, with no means to return to Earth.

== Development ==
Ultima VII was the first game where Richard Garriott did any sort of planning ahead for future games in the series, laying out a preplanned trilogy which would conclude with Ultima IX.

Elements of Ultima VII were inspired by game developer Origin Systems' conflicts with competitor (and later owner) Electronic Arts. Origin Systems' corporate slogan was "We Create Worlds", while the main antagonist of the story – the Guardian – is presented as a "Destroyer of Worlds". The three evil "Generators" created by the Guardian in the game take the physical shapes of the contemporary Electronic Arts logo: a cube, a sphere, and a tetrahedron. Elizabeth and Abraham, two apparently benevolent characters who later turn out to be murderers, have the initials "E" and "A". Electronic Arts would acquire Origin later that same year, on September 25, 1992.

The religious cult the Fellowship is inspired by Scientology. Richard Garriott also said it was inspired by the action role-playing game Times of Lore and the first-person role-playing game Dungeon Master. Ultima VII cost $1 million to develop, about $2.29 million in today's dollars.

The game credits have been made to look as movie-like as possible, with all of the standard disclaimers and elements found in movie end credits. The credits, notoriously, also include the mention that a soundtrack CD is available from Origin, while it actually wasn't released until 1993 (as Origin Soundtrack Series volume 2); in reference to this mistake, the credits of Ultima VII Part Two: Serpent Isle say, "Soundtrack CD NOT available from Origin, so don't ask!"

The Black Gate uses a custom DOS extender called "Voodoo" which puts the CPU in an unreal mode and is incompatible with other DOS extenders following the DPMI standard.

== Reception ==
Reception

Review scores
Publication	Score
AllGame	4/5
Dragon	4/5
GamePro	3.5 / 5

Award
Publication	Award
Computer Gaming World	Role-Playing Game of the Year (Nomination)

Computer Gaming World's Scorpia in 1992 praised Ultima VII: The Black Gate's "first-class" graphics, sound, and realism, called the story "engrossing", and liked the mouse- and keyboard-based user interface, but criticized the slow performance ("I estimate that the slow speed of the game added about a week to my playing time"), several serious bugs, and combat ("one of the least fun aspects of the game"). She concluded that the game gives "me very mixed feelings ... Getting through this Ultima will require a certain amount of patience and forebearance". In 1993 she wrote that "the game has its annoying aspects ... it is certainly worth playing". Charles Ardai acknowledged the widespread sentiment that after six installments the Ultima series had been done to death, but argued that "Ultima VII is not more of the same. It is daring and unusual, has a sophisticated interface and story, takes full advantage of both its own history and the conventions of the genre, and manages to be at once grounded in tradition and unpredictable". Ardai praised the plot as the best in the series, stating that it is highly original, evokes genuine emotion, and serves as an allegory for problems in the real world. He also generally praised the game's puzzles, simple interface, and pacing. Ultima VII: The Black Gate and Forge of Virtue were reviewed in 1993 in Dragon #191 by Hartley, Patricia, and Kirk Lesser in "The Role of Computers" column. The reviewers gave the game 4 out of 5 stars.

Jim Trunzo reviewed Ultima VII: The Black Gate in White Wolf #33 (Sept./Oct., 1992), rating it a 4.5 out of 5 and stated that "Overall, Ultima VII: The Black Gate continues to advance the series in every sense of the word. For most fantasy gamers, it will be a 'must experience' event. However, be sure that you have the system required to enjoy the product before you buy it."

Computer Gaming World nominated Ultima VII for its 1992 "Role-Playing Game of the Year" award, which ultimately went to Ultima Underworld: The Stygian Abyss. They wrote that Ultima VII "pushed the technological envelope with its new AI routines for party movement, as well as its object-oriented approach to the game map.

GamePro gave the Super NES version a mixed review. They praised the gameplay interface and controls, but criticized the fact that monsters and chests respawn whenever the player leaves an area, pointing out that this allows players to easily accumulate massive amounts of loot simply by repeatedly leaving and reentering a room with a chest. They rated the graphics and sounds as decent but unimpressive, and concluded the game to be "nicely crafted fun".

=== Accolades ===
The Black Gate was listed as one of "The 50 Best Games Ever" in a 1997 issue of PC Gamer, and ranked number ten on the magazine's list of "The 100 Best PC Games of All Time" in a 2011 survey. In 1998, PC Gamer US declared it the 37th-best computer game ever released. The editors wrote, "If you're looking for the best of the greatest computer role-playing series ever, this is the game you want."

In 1994, PC Gamer UK named The Black Gate and Serpent Isle collectively the 39th best computer game of all time. The editors called it "absolutely enormous—we are talking months of play here—with complex, absorbing and involving multiple sub-plots and storylines. Garriott's commitment to creating a complete fantasy world has been fully realised here." In 1996, GamesMaster ranked the game 72nd on their "Top 100 Games of All Time."

== Forge of Virtue expansion ==
Box cover for Ultima VII: Forge of Virtue expansion, depicting The Black Sword

Forge of Virtue was an expansion pack that adds a quest to Ultima VII in which the Avatar must pass a series of tests to revalidate himself in the three principles of Truth, Love, and Courage, and destroy the last remnants of Exodus. The expansion pack was originally released on September 7, 1992.

With the expansion, an earthquake takes place at the beginning of the game. After speaking to Lord British about the tremors, the player will be given free use of a ship called The Golden Ankh, and can visit the Isle of Fire to begin the expansion subquests. The Isle of Fire was previously the site of Castle Exodus in Ultima III, and reappears only during this game.

The main plot of the subquests involves destroying the Dark Core, which contains the last remnants of Exodus. In order to do so, the Avatar must obtain three talismans of Truth, Love and Courage, by passing their respective tests. The concave and convex lenses from Ultima VI are also required to complete the quest.

The player is rewarded with a powerful weapon, the Black Sword, during the test of Courage. The Avatar also gains maximum strength, intelligence, and dexterity in the course of the tests, and after completing the quest, Lord British grants the player double strength on top of that. The Golden Ankh contains many extra supplies and the Avatar can use it for the rest of the game, making it unnecessary to purchase deeds from shipwrights.

In later releases of Ultima VII, this add-on was always included.

=== Reception ===
Computer Gaming World stated that the expansion improved combat and other aspects of gameplay. As it only added a few hours of time to Ultima VII's estimated more than 200 hours, the magazine described it as "sort of a 'cheat' program ... mak[ing] a great game even better" that made completing the main plot easier by giving players higher stats and powerful new gear.

== Versions and releases ==
The various parts of Ultima VII have been published in at least the following forms:

Original release:

- Ultima VII: The Black Gate (1992) The original release, available on 5.25" and 3.5" floppies. This release predates the ESRB, and as such, was not rated by them. The game credits do include the warning "Voluntarily rated MP-13 (For Mature Players)".
- Ultima VII: Forge of Virtue (1992) The original release, available on 5.25" and 3.5" floppies.
- Ultima VII Part Two: Serpent Isle (1993) The original release, available on 5.25" and 3.5" floppies.
- Ultima VII Part Two: The Silver Seed (1993) The original release, available on 5.25" and 3.5" floppies.

Re-releases:

- Ultima VII: Complete Edition (1993) has both games and both expansion disks, available on 3.5" floppies only.
- The Complete Ultima VII (1994) has both games and both expansion disks, on CD-ROM. Rated T for Teen by the ESRB for "Animated Blood and Gore, Animated Violence".
- Ultima: The Black Gate (1994): the original SNES action-adventure remake.
- Electronic Arts CD-ROM Classics: The Complete Ultima VII (1994): budget release that has both games and both expansion disks, on CD-ROM. Aside of a brief installation and quick-start guide, no printed documentation or trinkets; all documentation is on CD-ROM in PDF format.
- Electronic Arts CD-ROM Classics: The Complete Ultima VII: Gold Edition (1996): same as the 1994 release, but with gold-edged box.

In addition, it has been published as part of collections:

- Origin Top Ten Pack Includes Ultima VII: The Black Gate (pre EA buyout).
- EA Compilation, bundled with some Creative Labs sound cards.
- Ultima Collection (1996) Contains all cardinal Ultima games between Ultima I and Ultima VIII, and also Akalabeth.

The Black Gate was released in English, German, French and Spanish.

=== Included in the box ===
Like other Ultima games, Ultima VII came with a trinket, a cloth map, and in-universe manuals. The trinket was a triangle-shaped Fellowship medallion. The cloth map was of Britannia. It included the Fellowship book. It also included a demo-disk for Ultima Underworld.

Its expansion pack, Ultima VII: Forge of Virtue, included the Guide to the Isle of Fire pamphlet.

=== Super NES ===
FCI / Pony Canyon published the Super NES version of Ultima VII, simply titled Ultima: The Black Gate, which was created by a small team inside Origin Systems. The game producer and part of that team previously took part into the development of Ultima: Runes of Virtue II.

This version is largely different from the original, since the PC version of the game was a then-huge 20 megabytes, yet this translation could use only one megabyte of memory for all of the game data and program. The game is largely real-time action, bearing many similarities to Ultima: Runes of Virtue I & II.

The maps and many usable items and plotlines had to be redesigned from scratch, and the game program had to be rewritten entirely in assembly language. The 'party' system was scrapped; instead, the Avatar journeys alone. Also, the story was largely changed in accordance with Nintendo's content guidelines: instead of murders, the Avatar is asked to investigate kidnappings.

=== PlayStation Portable ===
In August 2006, GameSpot reported that Electronic Arts would be porting Ultima: The Black Gate (the SNES version of Ultima VII) to the PlayStation Portable as part of EA Replay. It was released in the United States on November 14, 2006.

== Legacy ==
GOG.com has made the game available in a manner that allows it to work on modern operating systems, through a custom DOSBox installation.

Exult is a cross-platform recreation of the Ultima VII engine, licensed under the GNU GPL-2.0-or-later, which allows the game to be played on modern machines and across different operating systems. Exult's array of tools have enabled fans to take the game apart and modify it, for instance for fan translation projects. Exult contributors have also expanded the game by enabling Serpent Isle paper doll graphics in Black Gate, and fixed some of the bugs and design flaws found in Serpent Isle, which were originally left in due to the rushed release. There are some features of the original game still to be implemented (for example, the way NPCs interact with the game world is not fully recreated) and some extra features added by the Exult team. The Exult project was noticed and positively commented upon by Richard Garriott.
