= Ultima IV: Quest of the Avatar =

1985 video game

- Cover art by Denis Loubet
- Developer: Origin Systems
- Publishers: Origin Systems: NA: Origin Systems; EU: U.S. Gold (C64); EU: MicroProse (Amiga, ST, MS-DOS); JP: Pony Canyon (Famicom); NA: FCI (NES); EU: Sega (SMS)
- Designer: Richard Garriott
- Artists: Denis Loubet; Patricia Hunter; Marsha Meuse
- Writers: Richard Garriott; Roe Adams
- Composer: Kenneth W. Arnold
- Series: Ultima
- Platforms: Amiga, Apple II, Atari 8-bit, Atari ST, Commodore 64, MS-DOS, FM Towns, FM-7, MSX2, Master System, NES, PC-88, PC-98, X1, X68000
- Release: September 16, 1985: Apple II; NA: September 16, 1985 Commodore 64; NA: December 1985; EU: 1986 Atari 8-bit; NA: February 1986 FM-7, PC-88, PC-98; JP: July 1987 MSX2, Sharp X1; JP: 1987 MS-DOS; NA: October 1987; EU: 1987 Atari ST; NA: 1987; EU: 1987 Amiga; NA: 1988; EU: 1988 X68000; JP: December 21, 1988 Famicom/NES; JP: September 20, 1989; NA: December 1990 Master System; EU: 1990 FM Towns; JP: April 1992
- Genre: Role-playing
- Mode: Single-player

Ultima IV: Quest of the Avatar, first released in 1985 for the Apple II, is the fourth in the series of Ultima role-playing video games. It is the first in the "Age of Enlightenment" trilogy, shifting the series from the hack and slash, dungeon crawl gameplay of its "Age of Darkness" predecessors towards an ethically nuanced, story-driven approach. Ultima IV has a much larger game world than its predecessors, with an overworld map sixteen times the size of Ultima III and puzzle-filled dungeon rooms to explore. Ultima IV further advances the franchise with dialog improvements, new means of travel and exploration, and world interactivity.

In 1996 Computer Gaming World named Ultima IV as #2 on its Best Games of All Time list for IBM PC compatibles. Designer Richard Garriott considers this game to be among his favorites from the Ultima series.

Ultima IV was followed by the release of Ultima V: Warriors of Destiny in 1988.

== Plot ==
Ultima IV on the Commodore 64

Ultima IV is among the few role-playing games, and perhaps the first, in which the game's story does not center on asking a player character to overcome a tangible ultimate evil. The story instead focuses on the player character's moral self-improvement.

After the defeat of each of the members of the Triad of Evil in the previous three Ultima games, the world of Sosaria underwent some radical changes in geography: Three quarters of the world disappeared, continents rose and sank, and new cities were built to replace the ones that were lost. Eventually the world, now unified under Lord British's rule, was renamed Britannia. Lord British felt the people lacked purpose after their great struggles against the Triad were over, and he was concerned with their spiritual well-being in this unfamiliar new age of relative peace, so he proclaimed the Quest of the Avatar: He needed someone to step forth and become the shining example for others to follow.

Unlike most other RPGs the game is not set in an "age of darkness"; prosperous Britannia resembles Renaissance Italy, or King Arthur's Camelot. The object of the game is to focus on the main character's development in virtuous life—possible because the land is at peace—and become a spiritual leader and an example to the people of the world of Britannia. The game follows the protagonist's struggle to understand and exercise the Eight Virtues. After proving his or her understanding in each of the Virtues, locating several artifacts and finally descending into the dungeon called the Stygian Abyss to gain access to the Codex of Ultimate Wisdom, the protagonist becomes an Avatar.

Conversely, actions in the game could remove a character's gained Virtues, distancing them from the construction of Truth, Love, Courage and the greater axiom of Infinity—all required to complete the game. Though Avatarhood is not exclusive to one chosen person, the hero remains the only known Avatar throughout the later games, and as time passes he is increasingly regarded as a myth.

== Gameplay ==
Instead of simply choosing stats to assign points to as in the first three Ultima games, players are asked various ethical dilemmas by a gypsy fortune-teller using remotely tarot-like cards of the eight virtues. These situations do not have one correct resolution; rather, players must rank the Eight Virtues and whichever stands as their highest priority determines the type of character they will play. For example, choosing Compassion creates a Bard, Honor a Paladin, Sacrifice a Tinker, and so on. This is also the first Ultima where playing as a human is necessary, eliminating other races such as the elves, dwarves, and "bobbits" found in previous games (although even in the first three Ultimas where they could be chosen as player characters, there were never any non-player characters (NPC) of those non-human races).

Although each profession embodies a particular Virtue, to become an Avatar the player must achieve enlightenment in all eight virtues. Virtue affects how NPCs interact with the player; enlightenment in the Virtues is achieved through the player's actions as well as through meditation at shrines. Shrines to each of the Virtues are scattered about Britannia, each requiring the player to possess the corresponding Virtue's rune before allowing entry. Through meditation and correctly repeating the Virtue's mantra three times at the shrine, the player gains insight and ultimately enlightenment in the Virtue. The seer Hawkwind in Lord British's castle provides the player with feedback on their progress in the Virtues, offering advice for actions that will improve their standing in each of the Eight Virtues, informing them when they are ready to visit a shrine for elevation, or chastising the character if they "hath strayed far from the path of the Avatar". A player may be encouraged to give alms to the poor to improve their Sacrifice, or never flee from battle to improve their Valor. Players are equally able to lower their virtue by their in-game actions, such as selecting a bragging response in a dialog with certain characters (lowers Humility). While most actions have a minor effect on a Virtue's progress, certain actions can have an immediate and devastating effect on a player's progress on multiple Virtues.

Technically, the game was very similar to Ultima III: Exodus, although much larger. It is the first Ultima to feature a dynamic conversation system; whereas NPCs in earlier games would only give one canned answer when talked to, now players could interact with them by specifying a subject of conversation, the subject determined either by a standard set of questions (name, job, health) or by information gleaned from the previous answers, or from other characters. Many sub-quests were arranged around this. Users playing the game a second time could save considerable time by knowing the answers to key questions, which frequently required travel to another city to talk with another NPC. In at least one case, a player is asked "Who sent you?", which may require yet another round trip between cities.

Another addition were dungeon rooms, uniquely designed combat areas in the dungeons that supplemented the standard combat against randomly appearing enemies.

Ultima IV is an open world game; most quests can be completed in any order. There are no fetch quests. Although it is a turn-based game, the clock runs while the game was running. If a player does not act for a while, NPCs and monsters may move and time passes. Time is an important aspect to the game, as certain actions can only be performed at certain times.

The world of Britannia was first introduced here in full, and the world map in the series did not greatly change in later games. The player may travel about Britannia by foot, on horseback, across the sea in a ship or by air in a "lighter than air device". Speed and ease of travel is affected by the mode of travel as well as terrain and wind.

=== Virtues ===
Annotated approximation of the Codex symbol – the virtues (numbered) are associated with the principles (italics in shaded circles) they touch

The Eight Virtues of the Avatar, their relationship to the Three Principles of Truth, Love, and Courage, and how gameplay has been designed around them are as follows:

- Honesty: Truth
  When purchasing goods from blind merchants, the player is required to enter the amount of gold they wish to pay. Although the player has the option of paying less than the merchant has asked for, this will mark the player as dishonest. Stealing gold from chests in towns, villages and castles will also penalize the player. This Virtue is embodied by Mariah the Mage.
- Compassion: Love
  By using the Give conversation subject, a player can give beggars alms; doing so demonstrates Compassion. This Virtue is embodied by Iolo the Bard.
- Valor: Courage
  Valor is displayed by the player defeating enemies in combat and not fleeing in a cowardly fashion. This means that when retreat is necessary, the player should be the last party member to leave the field of battle. This Virtue is embodied by Geoffrey the Fighter.
- Justice: Truth and Love
  Not all of the hostile creatures in Britannia are evil and the player must avoid unprovoked attacks on those that are not. If attacked, he should resort to driving them away rather than killing them. Out of the eight virtues, this one requires the most finesse to embody and is a particularly good example of balancing ethical dilemmas. The player's party must stand their ground for Valor, yet drive their foes away without killing them. This Virtue is embodied by Jaana the Druid.
- Sacrifice: Love and Courage
  If the player goes to a place of healing while in good health, the player can make a blood donation and sacrifice some health in doing so. One noted critic, Scorpia of Computer Gaming World, reported that players who wrote her for hints had the most trouble with self-sacrifice, believing that giving gold to others was sufficient, as opposed to donating blood. Helping others retreat from battle and losing Valor points is another way of increasing Sacrifice. This Virtue is embodied by Julia the Tinker. In the NES port, she was replaced with a male character named Julius.
- Honor: Truth and Courage
  By finding sacred items and exploring dungeons the player demonstrates Honor. This Virtue is embodied by Dupre the Paladin.
- Spirituality: Truth, Love, and Courage
  Meditating at shrines, consulting the seer, and achieving enlightenment in the other Virtues enhances the player's Spirituality. This Virtue is embodied by Shamino the Ranger.
- Humility: None, though it is considered the root of all Virtue.
  The player demonstrates Humility during conversations. A boastful response to a question results in a penalty, while a humble response results in a bonus. This Virtue is embodied by Katrina the Shepherd.

== Development ==
Richard Garriott has said that he received no customer feedback for his first three games because neither California Pacific Computer nor Sierra On-Line forwarded him mail. After his own company released Ultima III, Garriott—who attended an interdenominational Christian Sunday School as a teenager—realized (partly from letters of enraged parents) that in the earlier games, immoral actions like stealing and murder of peaceful citizens had been necessary or at least very useful actions in order to win the game, and that such features might be objectionable. Garriott said he wanted to become a good storyteller and make certain the story had content, and that 90% of the games out there, including his first three Ultima games, were what he called "go kill the evil bad guy" stories. He said, "Ultima IV was the first one that had ethical overtones in it, and it also was just a better-told story." Shay Addams, Garriott's official biographer, wrote, "He decided that if people were going to look for hidden meaning in his work when they didn't even exist, he would introduce ideas and symbols with meaning and significance he deemed worthwhile, to give them something they could really think about." To encourage a sense of responsibility for their character's actions, players were intended to feel they were playing themselves transported into a fantasy realm, not a separate person. Garriott removed gameplay elements he believed would prevent players from identifying personally with their character, such as playing as a non-human.

Decades after the game's release, 1UP.com described Ultima IV as "a direct barb at the self-appointed moral crusaders who sought to demonize RPGs" and complained that "the irony in seeing an 'evil' RPG better present the Christian admonition to back faith with works in quiet modesty than the Bible-waving watchdog decrying the medium seems to have been lost". The game's moral dilemmas were designed to give players the opportunity to reap temporary rewards for amoral behavior, only to realize later that they have been penalized. Garriott hoped they would approach later dilemmas with more thoughtfulness. Near the end of the game, he took advantage of this to encourage players to overthink the puzzles and question the morality of their choices. At one point, players are seemingly required to murder children, who are revealed to be monsters in disguise. Though one playtester threatened to quit over this dilemma, Garriott refused to remove it from the game, reasoning that it had served its purpose in provoking an emotional response.

The game's concept originated from when Garriott was watching a television documentary about religion that covered the Dead Sea Scrolls and a Hindu temple in India. The concept of virtues was inspired by a TV show about the Avatars of Hindu mythology, which described the avatars as having to master 16 virtues. The eight virtues used in the game were derived from combinations of truth, love, and courage, a set of motivators Garriott found worked best, and also found in one of his favorite films, The Wizard of Oz. The game took two years to develop, twice that of both Ultima II and Ultima III. Garriott described the playtesting as "slightly rushed" to make the Christmas season; he was the only one to finish playing through the game by the time it went out for publishing.

Like contemporary Origin games, Ultima IV was developed for the Apple II, then ported to other computers, partially because Garriott himself was an Apple II user/coder, partially because this made ports easier. Garriott said in 1984 that the Commodore 64 and Atari 8-bit's sprites and hardware sound chips made porting from them to Apple "far more difficult, perhaps even impossible ... the Apple version will never get done". Like previous games, Ultima IV does not permit saving in dungeons because of technical limitations that Garriott described as "non-trivial".

The ankh used as the symbol of the Avatar's virtuous path, was chosen after Garriott saw it in the film Logan's Run.

Garriott said in a 1985 interview that he was working on both Ultima IV: Part 2 and Ultima V. Eventually, only Ultima V realized.

== Versions ==
=== Apple II ===
Like previous Ultimas, Richard Garriott wrote most of the core code himself; as the games were getting too complex for one person to handle, however, he was required to call in outside assistance for programming tasks with which he was not familiar, such as music and optimized disk routines. Ultima IV was the first game in the series to require a 64k Apple II and primarily targeted the newer Apple IIe and IIc, although it could still run on an Apple II+ if a language card was used to boost the system to 64k (Garriott himself was still using a II+ at this time). As had happened with Ultima III, Ultima IV also included support for the Mockingboard sound card, which enabled Apple II users to have 3-voice music. Custom disk routines allowed Ultima IV to have faster disk access than the previous games, which was also important as the growing size of the game caused it to now use two floppy disks instead of one.

The dialog of two NPCs in the Apple II release were accidentally not entered, leaving them in their default test states. One of these NPCs was the most elusive in the game, and provided the player with the final answer they would require to complete the game. With this character not responding properly, players were forced to guess the correct answer or find it from sources outside the game to complete it. This bug would later be acknowledged in Ultima V, where the NPC appears again and admits his mistake to the player.

=== Commodore 64 ===
The Commodore 64 port was the first in the series to take full advantage of the computer's hardware rather than simply converting the sound and graphics from the Apple II, and include in-game music. It came on two 1541 disks and like the Apple II, Side 1 of Disk 1 (labeled "Program") was copy protected while the other disk sides ("Overworld", "Town", and "Dungeon") were not and the user was instructed to make backups of them. Ultima IV also added support for two disk drives, in which case the user would keep the Overworld side of Disk 1 in Drive 0 and flip the Town/Dungeon disk as needed in Drive 1. The Overworld disk is also used to load/save the player's progress. One of the biggest criticisms of the C64 port was a lack of any disk fast loader, which made for extremely slow disk access against the speed-optimized disk routines in the Apple version.

=== Atari 8-bit ===
Ultima IV was the final game in the series ported to the Atari 8-bit computers. It does not include music. The game was distributed on the single-density disks, so it occupies four disks instead of two, as with the Apple II and Commodore 64 versions.

=== IBM PC compatibles ===
The IBM PC compatible version of Ultima IV, released two years after the 8-bit versions, added EGA and Tandy graphics support, as well as proper hard disk support. There is no music. Only the MS-DOS and the Atari ST (below) allow to transfer the player character to Ultima V and VI.

=== Amiga and Atari ST ===
The Atari ST version of Ultima IV was released in 1987 and the Amiga version in 1988. Both are similar to the IBM PC port and do not fully use their machines' respective hardware features. The Atari ST version supports MIDI for the music, however, the music can be played on a connected MIDI synthesizer or sampler. The Atari ST port supports both music and sound effects, while the Amiga only has music. Both ports use the mouse. Only the Atari ST allows to transfer the player character to Ultima V and VI.

=== NES ===
Ultima IV on the NES

Like Ultima III, Ultima IV was released to NES by FCI and Pony Canyon. This version, titled Ultima: Quest of the Avatar, was released in 1990.

The NES port of Ultima IV is very different from the other versions: the graphics had been completely redone, as was the music, and the dialogue options were greatly reduced. Among other gameplay changes, the player cannot have all seven recruitable characters in the player's party at the same time, as one could in other versions. Any character over the four the player could have would stay at a hostel at Castle Britannia, requiring the player to return there to change characters. The combat system was fairly close to the personal computer games, however, with the additional option to use automated combat. Additionally the spell-casting was simplified, removing the need to mix spells. Some puzzles were removed as well. This port also replaced the character Julia the Tinker with a male character named Julius. Some of these changes were done because of the memory limitations of being on a single cartridge instead of multiple floppy diskettes.

=== Master System ===
Ultima IV: Quest of the Avatar for the Master System is the only Ultima to be ported to a Sega platform. It was released in 1990 and was both ported and published by Sega. The port features completely re-drawn graphics (although unlike the NES port, the style was retained from Origin's version), a simpler conversation system and, unlike the NES version, uses the regular Ultima IV background music. Although the Master System is easily capable of displaying more complex first-person scenes than those found in Ultima IV (see Phantasy Star), this version's dungeons are viewed from a top-down perspective, much like those of Ultima VI, which was released the same year. It seems that most of these cartridges were produced for the European market, as they contain a multi-lingual (English, French and German) manual, both books from the original version as well as a folded paper map. The books were of different colour for each of the three editions (blue for the UK version), fully translated and did not fit inside the game's box. There is a graphical error in this version where the gypsy's picture is of a man with a mustache even though the gypsy is referred to as "she" throughout the text.

=== Ultima IV on modern operating systems ===
xu4 is a cross-platform game engine recreation of Ultima IV under development for Dreamcast, Linux, macOS, RISC OS and Windows.

Ultima IV on a PC, with the xu4 patch applied. The patch modernizes graphics, sound and gameplay.

Two other remakes were using the Neverwinter Nights engine. An online version was written in Adobe Flash. In March 2011, Electronic Arts sent a DMCA "cease and desist" notice to this fan project. In 2015 a fan-made remaster project for the Commodore 64 version of the game was released with source code on GitHub, addressing bugs and improving other aspects of the game.

A DOS version of Ultima IV is available for free through GOG.com. Publisher and IP owner Electronic Arts has released the game as freeware in 2011 to promote its free-to-play remake Ultima Forever: Quest for the Avatar, which it would release in 2013.

== Reception ==
Reception (console versions)

Review scores
Publication	Score
Computer and Video Games	89% (Master System)
Electronic Gaming Monthly	5/10, 8/10, 8/10, 7/10 (SMS) 8/10, 8/10, 8/10, 6/10 (NES)
Famitsu	31/40 (Famicom)
GamePro	21/25 (NES)

Ultima IV was the top game on Billboard's list of software best sellers for February and March 1986. In the United States, Ultima IV had sold more than 100,000 copies by August 1986. Global sales of Ultima IV had surpassed 400,000 copies by May 1989.

Scorpia of Computer Gaming World in 1986 called it "an incredible game", only criticizing the fact that experience only came from combat, which she stated became "tedious". Scorpia concluded, "What are you waiting for? This will be a classic... go get it!!" The game became the first to replace Wizardry: Proving Grounds of the Mad Overlord—the top-rated adventure game for five years—in the magazine's reader poll, and it named Ultima IV as the game of the year for 1986. In 1987 Scorpia cited Ultima IV for taking the genre away from hack and slash—"for the first time, we have a CRPG whose focus IS character development. Not how many monsters you kill, nor how much loot you can pick up"—in 1991 and 1993 called it her favorite game, in 1994 stated that "maybe nothing ever will" surpass it, and after retiring from reviewing games called it "my all-time, number one, favorite RPG".

In June 1986, Dragon's Hartley and Pattie Lesser called Ultima IV "The most impressive and complex adventure to date; a total adventuring environment that takes place across an entire continent." In the September 1986 issue, Mike Gray lauded the game as "the best computer simulation of a true fantasy role-playing experience I have ever seen. If you have an Apple II or a Commodore 64 or 128, your treasure hoard of computer FRP games will not be complete unless and until you get your hands on this one". He praised Ultima IV as "incredible. If you can find it in a store, don't pass it up... Don't be discouraged if it takes you a while to find a copy — that search will be an easy one compared to what awaits you when you start the Quest of the Avatar".

Famitsu reviewed the Famicom (NES) version and scored it 31 out of 40. Computer and Video Games magazine reviewed the Sega Master System version in 1990, giving it an 89% score.

Co-creator of Dungeons & Dragons Dave Arneson in 1988 wrote that Ultima IV and a few other games "have stood pretty much alone as quirks instead of trend setters" in the CRPG industry, as other games did not follow their innovations.

With a score of 7.80 out of 10, in 1988 Ultima IV was among the first members of the Computer Gaming World Hall of Fame for those games rated highly over time by readers. In 1990 the game received the third-highest number of votes in a survey of readers' "All-Time Favorites". In 1996, the magazine ranked it as the second-best video game of all time, and the second most-innovative computer game. In 2013, IGN placed Ultima IV at #26 in its list of top 100 RPGs of all time. In 2015, Peter Tieryas of Tor.com stated that the NES version "represented a different type of ideal... You make up the narrative and you determine the course of your journey, engendering a sense of immersion that had the effect of making you feel like you were in more control than any previous RPG."

== See also ==
- Ultima Forever: Quest for the Avatar
