= Ultima (series) =

Role-playing video game series

- The most commonly used logo in the series
- Genre: Role-playing
- Developers: Origin Systems; Sierra On-Line; Blue Sky Productions; Looking Glass Studios; Electronic Arts; Bioware Mythic; EA Phenomic; Escalation Studios; OtherSide Entertainment
- Publishers: California Pacific Computer Company; Sierra On-Line; Origin Systems; Pony Canyon; Fujisankei Communications International; Electronic Arts; 505 Games
- Creator: Richard Garriott
- Platforms: Amiga, Apple II, Atari 8-bit, Atari ST, Commodore 64, Commodore 128, FM-7, FM Towns, Game Boy, iOS, Linux, MS-DOS, MSX, Mac OS, Master System, NES, PC-8800 series, PC-98, PlayStation, PlayStation 4, Sharp X1, SNES, VIC-20, Windows, X68000, Xbox One
- First release: Ultima I: The First Age of Darkness; 1981
- Latest release: Underworld Ascendant; 2018

Ultima is a series of open world fantasy role-playing video games from Origin Systems, created by Richard Garriott. Electronic Arts has owned the brand since 1992. The series had sold over 2 million copies by 1997.

Alongside Wizardry and Might and Magic, the Ultima series is considered to have established many norms of the computer role-playing game genre. Several games of the series are considered seminal in their genre. Their innovations, particularly in the early installments, were widely copied by other games.

The Ultima games are primarily within the scope of fantasy fiction but contain science fiction elements as well. They take place for the most part in a world called Britannia; the recurring hero is initially called the Stranger, until he attains the role of Avatar in Ultima IV and is known by that appellation from then on.

== Games ==
Release timeline Main series in bold
1979	**Akalabeth**
1980
1981	**Ultima I**
1982	**Ultima II**
1983	**Ultima III**
1983	Escape from Mt. Drash
1984
1985	**Ultima IV**
1986–1987
1988	**Ultima V**
1989
1990	**Ultima VI**
1990	Worlds of Ultima
1991	Ultima: Worlds of Adventure 2
1991	Ultima: Runes of Virtue
1992	Ultima Underworld
1992	**Ultima VII**
1993	Ultima Underworld II
1993	**Ultima VII Part Two**
1993	Ultima: Runes of Virtue II
1994	**Ultima VIII**
1995–1996
1997	Ultima Online
1998
1999	**Ultima IX**
2000–2009
2010	Lord of Ultima
2011–2012
2013	Ultima Forever
2014–2017
2018	Underworld Ascendant

The main Ultima series consists of nine installments (with the seventh title divided into two parts) grouped into three trilogies, or "Ages": The Age of Darkness (Ultima I-III), The Age of Enlightenment (Ultima IV-VI), and The Age of Armageddon (Ultima VII-IX). The last is also sometimes referred to as "The Guardian Saga" after its chief antagonist. The first trilogy is set in a fantasy world named Sosaria, but during the cataclysmic events of The Age of Darkness, it is sundered and three-quarters of it vanish. What is left becomes known as Britannia, a realm ruled by the benevolent Lord British, and is where the later games mostly take place. The protagonist in all the games is a resident of Earth who is called upon by Lord British to protect Sosaria and, later, Britannia from a number of dangers. Originally, the player character was referred to as "the Stranger", but by the end of Ultima IV he becomes universally known as the Avatar.

=== Main series ===
==== The Age of Darkness: Ultima I–III ====
In Ultima I: The First Age of Darkness (1981), the Stranger is first summoned to Sosaria to defeat the evil wizard Mondain who aims to enslave it. Since Mondain possesses the Gem of Immortality, which makes him invulnerable, the Stranger locates a time machine, travels back in time to kill Mondain before he creates the Gem, and shatters the incomplete artifact.

Ultima II: The Revenge of the Enchantress (1982) details Mondain's secret student and lover Minax's attempt to avenge him. When Minax launches an attack on the Stranger's homeworld of Earth, her actions cause doorways to open to various times and locations throughout Earth's history, and brings forth legions of monsters to all of them. The Stranger, after obtaining the Quicksword that alone can harm her, locates the evil sorceress at Castle Shadowguard at the origin of time and defeats her.

Ultima III: Exodus (1983) reveals that Mondain and Minax had an offspring, the eponymous Exodus, "neither human, nor machine", according to the later games (it is depicted as a computer at the conclusion of the game, and it appears to be a demonic, self-aware artificial intelligence). Some time after Minax's death, Exodus starts its own attack on Sosaria and the Stranger is summoned once again to destroy it. Exodus was the first installment of the series featuring a player party system, which was used in many later games.

==== The Age of Enlightenment: Ultima IV–VI ====
Ultima IV: Quest of the Avatar (1985) marked a turning point in the series from the traditional "hero vs. villain" plots, instead introducing a complex alignment system based upon the Eight Virtues derived from the combinations of the Three Principles of Love, Truth and Courage. Although Britannia now prospers under Lord British's rule, he fears for his subjects' spiritual well-being and summons the Stranger again to become a spiritual leader of Britannian people by example. Throughout the game, the Stranger's actions determine how close he comes to this ideal. Upon achieving enlightenment in every Virtue, he can reach the Codex of Ultimate Wisdom and becomes the "Avatar", the embodiment of Britannia's virtues.

In Ultima V: Warriors of Destiny (1988), the Avatar returns to Britannia to find that after Lord British had been lost in the Underworld, Lord Blackthorn, who rules in his stead, was corrupted by the Shadowlords and enforces a radically twisted vision of the Virtues, deviating considerably from their original meaning. The Avatar and his companions proceed to rescue the true king, overthrow the tyrant, and restore the Virtues in their true form.

Ultima VI: The False Prophet (1990) details the invasion of Britannia by Gargoyles, which the Avatar and his companions have to repel. Over the course of the game, it is revealed that the Gargoyles have valid reasons to loathe the Avatar. Exploring the themes of racism and xenophobia, the game tasks the Avatar with understanding and reconciling two seemingly opposing cultures.

==== The Age of Armageddon: Ultima VII–IX ====
Ultima VII: The Black Gate (1992) sees the Avatar entangled in the plan of an ostensibly virtuous and benevolent organization named the Fellowship (inspired by Scientology) to create a gateway for the evil entity known as the Guardian to enter Britannia. Though all of the main line of Ultima games are arranged into trilogies, Richard Garriott later revealed that Ultima VII was the first game where he did any sort of planning ahead for future games in the series. He elaborated that "the first three didn't have much to do with each other, they were 'Richard Garriott learns to program'; IV through VI were a backwards-designed trilogy, in the sense that I tied them together as I wrote them; but VII-IX, the story of the Guardian, were a preplanned trilogy, and we had a definite idea of where we wanted to go." An expansion pack was released named Forge of Virtue that added a newly arisen volcanic island to the map that the Avatar was invited to investigate. The tie-in storyline was limited to this island, where a piece of Exodus (his data storage unit) had resurfaced. To leave the island again, the Avatar had to destroy this remnant of Exodus. In the process of doing so, he also created The Black Sword, an immensely powerful weapon possessed by a demon.

Ultima VII Part Two: Serpent Isle (1993) was released as the second part of Ultima VII because it used the same game engine as Ultima VII. According to interviews, Richard Garriott felt it therefore did not warrant a new number. Production was rushed due to deadlines set to the developers, and the storyline was cut short; remains of the original, longer storyline can be found in the database. Following the Fellowship's defeat, its founder Batlin flees to the Serpent Isle, pursued by the Avatar and companions. Serpent Isle is revealed as another fragment of former Sosaria, and its history which is revealed throughout the game provides many explanations and ties up many loose ends left over from the Age of Darkness era. Magical storms herald the unraveling of the dying world's very fabric, and the game's mood is notably melancholic, including the voluntary sacrificial death of a long-standing companion of the Avatar, Dupre. By the end of the game, the Avatar is abducted by the Guardian and thrown into another world, which becomes the setting for the next game in the series. The Silver Seed was an expansion pack for Ultima VII Part 2 where the Avatar travels back in time to plant a silver seed, thus balancing the forces that hold the Serpent Isle together. Like Forge of Virtue, the expansion contained an isolated sub-quest that was irrelevant to the main game's storyline, but provided the Avatar with a plethora of useful and powerful artifacts.

In Ultima VIII: Pagan (1994), the Avatar finds himself exiled by the Guardian to a world called "Pagan". The Britannic Principles and Virtues are unknown here. Pagan is ruled by the Elemental Titans, god-like servants of the Guardian. The Avatar defeats them with their own magic, ascending to demi-godhood himself, and finally returns to Britannia. A planned expansion pack, The Lost Vale, was canceled after Ultima VIII failed to meet sales expectations.

Ultima IX: Ascension (1999), the final installment of the series, sees Britannia conquered and its Virtues corrupted by the Guardian. The Avatar has to cleanse and restore them. The Guardian is revealed to be the evil part of the Avatar himself, expelled from him when he became the Avatar. To stop it, he has to merge with it, destroying himself as a separate entity. The unreleased version of the plot featured a more apocalyptic ending, with the Guardian and Lord British killed, Britannia destroyed, and the Avatar ascending to a higher plane of existence.

==== Collections ====
- Ultima Trilogy (1989) – an early compilation of the first three Ultima games released for the Apple II, Commodore 64 and DOS by Origin Systems.
- Ultima: The Second Trilogy (1992) – a later trilogy of the second three Ultima games released by Origin Systems for Commodore 64 and DOS.
- Ultima I–VI Series (1992) – a compilation of the first six Ultima games and published for DOS by Software Toolworks. Includes reprints of the instruction manuals and original maps.
- Ultima Collection (February 1998) – a CD-ROM collection of the first eight Ultima computer games published for DOS and Microsoft Windows 95/98, including their expansion packs. Includes a complete atlas of each game's map, a PC port of Akalabeth, and a sneak preview of Ultima IX.

=== Spin-offs and other games ===
Akalabeth: World of Doom was released in 1979, and is sometimes considered a precursor to the Ultima series.

Sierra On-Line also produced Ultima: Escape from Mt. Drash in 1983. The maze game has nothing in common with the others, but is highly sought after by collectors due to extreme rarity.

The Worlds of Ultima series is a spin-off of Ultima VI using the same game engine, following the Avatar's adventures after the game's conclusion:

- In Worlds of Ultima: The Savage Empire (1990), a failed experiment transports the Avatar to the Valley of Eodon, a jungle world populated by thirteen primitive tribes whom he must unite against a common enemy, the insectoid Myrmidex.
- Ultima: Worlds of Adventure 2: Martian Dreams (1991) takes place after The Savage Empire and sees the Avatar travel back in time to the Victorian era and eventually land on Mars to rescue humans stranded on it by accident and to restore the native Martian civilization.
- The third game, Ultima: Worlds of Adventure 3: Arthurian Legends, was planned to be set in the times of King Arthur but was canceled in 1993.

The second spin-off series, Ultima Underworld, consisted of three games with a first-person perspective:

- Set after Ultima VI, Ultima Underworld: The Stygian Abyss (1992) sees the Avatar descending into the Great Stygian Abyss to rescue a Britannian baron's kidnapped daughter and prevent the summoning of a powerful demon.
- Ultima Underworld II: Labyrinth of Worlds (1993) is set between the two parts of Ultima VII and starts with the Guardian trapping Lord British, the Avatar and his companions within an impenetrable barrier in their castle. To free them, the Avatar has to travel through several parallel universes looking for a way to undo the spell.
- Underworld Ascendant (2018), the third in the series, licensed the lore and characters for the Underworld setting, but did not allow use of the Ultima brand. The Avatar has been transported to the Underworld and works with local factions.

=== Console games ===
Console versions of Ultima have allowed further exposure to the series, especially in Japan where the games have been bestsellers and were accompanied by several tie-in products including Ultima cartoons and manga. In most cases, gameplay and graphics have been changed significantly.

==== Console ports of computer games ====
- Ultima III: Exodus (NES)
- Ultima: Quest of the Avatar (NES) - Remake: includes plot and gameplay changes.
- Ultima IV: Quest of the Avatar (Master System) — A faithful port of the original. Only released in Europe and South America.
- Ultima V: Warriors of Destiny (NES)
- Ultima VI: The False Prophet (Super NES) — Gameplay adapted for the game pad.
- Ultima: The Black Gate (SNES) — Action-adventure remake.
- Ultima: The Savage Empire (SNES) — A graphical update using the Black Gate engine for the SNES. Japan only, canceled in the US.
- Ultima Underworld: The Stygian Abyss (PlayStation) — Uses 3D models rather than the 2D sprites of the original. Released only in Japan.

==== Original console games ====
- Ultima: Runes of Virtue (1991) (Game Boy) — Non-canonical, action-based gameplay and puzzle solving. The game's antagonist is called the "Black Knight".
- Ultima: Runes of Virtue II (1993) (Game Boy, SNES)

=== Ultima Online MMORPG ===
Release timeline List of Ultima Online expansions
1998	The Second Age
1999
2000	Renaissance
2001	Third Dawn
2002	Lord Blackthorn's Revenge
2003	Age of Shadows
2004	Samurai Empire
2005	Mondain's Legacy
2006
2007
2008
2009	Stygian Abyss
2010	High Seas
2011
2012
2013
2014
2015	Time of Legends

Ultima Online (1997), a MMORPG spin-off of the main series, has become an unexpected hit, making it one of the earliest and longest-running successful MMORPGs of all time. Its lore retconned the ending of Ultima I, stating that when the Stranger shattered the Gem of Immortality, he discovered that it was tied to the world itself, therefore its shards each contained a miniature version of Britannia. The player characters in Ultima Online exist on these "shards". Eight expansion packs for UO have been released (The Second Age, Renaissance, Third Dawn, Lord Blackthorn's Revenge, Age of Shadows, Samurai Empire, Mondain's Legacy and Stygian Abyss). The aging UO graphic engine was renewed in 2007 with the official Kingdom Reborn client. Ultima Online 2, later renamed to Ultima Worlds Online: Origin and canceled in 2001, would have introduced steampunk elements to the game world, following Lord British's unsuccessful attempt to merge past, present, and future shards together.

UO spawned two sequel efforts that were canceled before release: Ultima Worlds Online: Origin (canceled in 2001, though the game's storyline was published in the Technocrat War trilogy) and Ultima X: Odyssey (canceled in 2004). Ultima X: Odyssey would have continued the story of Ultima IX. Now merged with the Guardian, the Avatar creates a world of Alucinor inside his mind, where the players were supposed to pursue the Eight Virtues in order to strengthen him and weaken the Guardian. Ultima X was developed without participation of the original creator Richard Garriott and he no longer owns the rights to the series. However, he still owns the rights to several of the game characters so it is impossible for either him or Electronic Arts to produce a new Ultima title without getting permission from each other.

=== Lord of Ultima ===
Lord of Ultima is a defunct free-to-play browser-based MMORTS released in 2010 by EA Phenomic. It was the first release in the Ultima series since Ultima Online, and also the first title to have no involvement from series creator Garriott or founding company Origin. It has been criticized for having slow-paced gameplay and very weak connections to the Ultima franchise lore. EA announced on February 12, 2014, that Lord of Ultima would be shut down and taken offline as of May 12, 2014.

=== Ultima Forever: Quest for the Avatar ===
Announced in summer 2012, Ultima Forever is a defunct free-to-play online action role-playing game. In contrast to Lord of Ultima, Ultima Forever returns to the lore of the original game series. As of August 29, 2014. Ultima Forever's servers were shut down.

=== Related Video Games ===
A group of volunteer programmers created Ultima V: Lazarus in 2005, a remake of Ultima V using the Dungeon Siege engine.

The Exult open-source project aims to recreate Ultima VII for modern operating systems, using the game's original plot, data, and graphics files.

=== Other media ===
Several novels were released under the Ultima name, including:

- The Ultima Saga by Lynn Abbey (Warner Books)
  - The Forge of Virtue (1991)
  - The Temper of Wisdom (1992)
- Ultima: The Technocrat War by Austen Andrews (Pocket Books)
  - Machinations (2001)
  - Masquerade (2002)
  - Maelstrom (2002)

In Japan, various novels, multiple gamebooks, a soundtrack CD, two kinds of wrist watches, a tape dispenser, a pencil holder, a board game, a jacket, and a beach towel were released. There were rumours of an Ultima anime cartoon, but its existence has been described as unlikely.

Four main manga comics were released in Japan:

- Ultima: EXODUS No Kyoufu (The Terror of EXODUS)
- Ultima: Quest of the Avatar
- Ultima: Magincia no Metsubou (The Fall of Magincia)
- Ultima: The Maze of Schwarzschild

== Packaging ==
Ultima game boxes often contained so-called "feelies"; e.g. from Ultima II on, every game in the main series came with a cloth map of the game world. Starting with Ultima IV, small trinkets like pendants, coins and magic stones were included. Made of metal or glass, they usually represented an important object found within the game itself.

Not liking how games were sold in zip lock bags with a few pages printed out for instructions, Richard Garriott insisted Ultima II be sold in a box, with a cloth map, and a manual. Sierra was the only company at that time willing to agree to this, and thus he signed with them.

== Copy protection measures ==
In the Atari 8bit version of Ultima IV one of the floppy disks had an unformatted track. In its absence the player would lose on every fight, which would not be obvious as a copy protection effect right away as one could assume that this was just due to either lack of experience or proper equipment. The protection mechanism was subtle enough to be overlooked by the German distributor that originally delivered Atari 8bit packages with floppies that were formatted regularly, and thus these paid copies acted like unlicensed copies, causing players to lose every battle.

In Ultima V, there were one or two instances where ostensibly insignificant information found in the accompanying booklet were asked by person(s) encountered in the game. The game also used runic script in some places and a special language for spell names, for both of which the necessary translation tables / explanations were provided in the booklet. Similarly, a journal of Lord British's doomed expedition into the underworld was included with the box; over the course of the game it turns out that the player will have to retrace the expedition's steps to recover a vital item. These can be seen as subtle copy-protection measures, well fitted for the context of history and fantasy so that a casual player didn't take them for copy protection.

Ultima VI introduced a more systematic use of copy protection in the form of in-game questions, preventing the player from progressing any further if the questions were answered incorrectly. In Ultima VII, this practice was continued, although in both games the player had an unlimited number of tries to answer the questions correctly. Answers could be obtained by consulting the manual or cloth map, although the manual released with the Ultima Collection contained all copy protection answers for every game.

In Ultima VII Part 2: Serpent Isle, the copy protection was changed slightly. Players were asked questions at two points in the game, and if they could not answer after two attempts, all NPCs said nothing but altered versions of famous quotes. Everything would also be labeled "Oink!", preventing the game from being played. From Ultima VIII onward, copy protection questions were discontinued.

== Common elements ==
=== Setting ===
Originally, the world of Ultima was made up of four continents. These were Lord British's Realm, ruled by Lord British and the Lost King; The Lands of Danger and Despair, ruled by Lord Shamino and the King of the White Dragon; The Lands of the Dark Unknown, ruled by Lord Olympus and the King of the Black Dragon; and The Lands of the Feudal Lords, ruled by the lords of Castle Rondorin and Castle Barataria.

After the defeat of Mondain and the shattering of his Gem of Immortality in Ultima I, there was a cataclysm that changed the structure of the world. Three of the four continents seemingly disappeared, leaving only Lord British's realm in the world. This remaining continent was referred from then on as "Sosaria". The Lands of Danger and Despair were later rediscovered as the Serpent Isle, which had been moved to a different dimension or plane, so it seems likely that the other two continents still exist. Ultima II shows Castle Barataria on Planet X, suggesting that the Lands of the Feudal Lords became this planet; Ultima Online: Samurai Empire posits that the Lands of the Feudal Lords was transformed into the Tokuno Islands by the cataclysm.

After the defeat of Exodus in Ultima III, Sosaria became Britannia in order to honor its ruler, Lord British. Serpent Isle remained connected with Britannia via a gate in the polar region. The Fellowship leader, Batlin, fled here after the Black Gate was destroyed in Ultima VII, preventing the Guardian's first invasion. Ninety percent of the island's population was destroyed by evil Banes released by Batlin in a foolish attempt to capture them for his own use in Ultima VII Part 2.

=== Virtues ===
The Virtues Paper doll interface Symbol in Ultima Online

In Ultima, the player takes the role of the Avatar, who embodies eight virtues. First introduced in Ultima IV, the Three Principles and the Eight Virtues marked a reinvention of the game focus from a traditional role-playing model into an ethically framed one. Each virtue is associated with a party member, one of Britannia's cities, and one of the eight other planets in Britannia's solar system. Each virtue also has a mantra and each principle a word of power that the player must learn. The Eight Virtues explored in Ultima are Honesty, Compassion, Valor, Justice, Sacrifice, Honor, Spirituality, and Humility. These Eight Virtues are based on the Three Principles of Truth, Love, and Courage. The Principles are derived from the One True Axiom, the combination of all Truth, all Love, and all Courage, which is Infinity.

The virtues were first introduced in Ultima IV: Quest of the Avatar (1985), where the goal of the game is to practice them and become a moral exemplar. Virtues and their variations are present in all later installments. Richard Garriott's motives in designing the virtue system were to build on the fact that games were provoking thought in the player, even unintentionally. As a designer, he "wasn't interested in teaching any specific lesson; instead, his next game would be about making people think about the consequences of their actions." The original virtue system in Ultima was partially inspired by the 16 ways of purification (sanskara) and character traits (samskara) which lead to Avatarhood in Hinduism. He also drew on his interpretation of characters from The Wizard of Oz, with the Scarecrow representing truth, the Tin Woodman representing love, and the Cowardly Lion representing courage.

Annotated approximation of the Codex symbol – the virtues (numbered) are associated with the principles (italics in shaded circles) they touch

The Virtues have become a frequent theme in the Ultima games following Ultima IV, with many different variants used throughout the series. Ultima V: Warriors of Destiny saw Lord Blackthorn turn the virtue system into a rigid and draconian set of laws. The rigid system of Blackthorn unintentionally causes the Virtues to actually achieve their polar opposites, in part due to the influence of the Shadowlords. This shows that the Virtues always come from one's own self, and that codifying ethics into law does not automatically make evil people good. Ultima VI: The False Prophet confronted the Avatar with the fact that, from another point of view, the Avatar's quests for Virtue may not appear virtuous at all, presenting an alternative set of virtues. In Ultima VII, an order known as the Fellowship displaced the Virtues with its own seemingly benevolent belief system, casting Britannia into disarray; and in Ultima IX, the Virtues had been inverted into their opposite anti-virtues.

Ultima's virtue system was considered a new frontier in game design, and has become "an industry standard, especially within role-playing games." The original system from Ultima IV has influenced moral systems in games such as Black & White, Star Wars: Knights of the Old Republic and the Fable series. However, Ultima can only be won by being virtuous, while other games typically offer a choice to be vicious. Mark Hayse specifically praises Ultima's virtue system for its subtlety. The game emphasizes the importance of virtue, but leaves the practice ambiguous with no explicit point values and limited guidance. This makes the virtue system more of a "philosophical journey" than an ordinary game puzzle.

=== Characters ===
==== The Stranger and the Avatar ====
The early Ultima games referred to the player-protagonist as the Stranger, with an open game design that allowed players to complete quests through theft or violence. After the release of Ultima III, creator Richard Garriott received letters from parents that criticized the Ultima series for allowing immoral actions, such as theft or murder against peaceful citizens. Garriott also received criticism about supposed Satanic content, particularly the demonic nature of the antagonist of Ultima III who appeared on the game packaging. In The Official Book of Ultima, Shay Addams described Richard Garriott's thinking, that "if people were going to look for hidden meaning in his work when they didn't even exist, he would introduce ideas and symbols with meaning and significance he deemed worthwhile, to give them something they could really think about." After watching a television show on Hinduism and the concept of the Avatar, Garriott was inspired to create his own system of eight Virtues for the next protagonist in Ultima IV, the Avatar.

The Avatar makes his first appearance in the fourth Ultima game, where his goal is to follow the path of the Virtues, and retrieve the Codex of Ultimate Wisdom from the Great Stygian Abyss. In the fifth game, the Avatar defeats a repressive regime in Britannia, and in the sixth, he brings peace between men and gargoyles. In Ultima VII and VIII, the Avatar battles the Guardian, finally destroying both himself and his foe in Ultima IX: Ascension.

With the exception of Ultima IX: Ascension, the player can choose the Avatar's name. Ultima VIII: Pagan fixed the Avatar's identity as a blond-haired blue-eyed male, while the other games allowed the player to select the Avatar's race, gender, and appearance. In Ultima IV onward, the player activates the Avatar's speech using singular keywords, until Ultima VII and Ultima Underworld allowed full dialog. Ultima IX added digitized speech to accompany the text.

The Avatar was initially designed to be a blank slate through which players could reflect their own personality The use of the word "avatar" in this manner is the first time that the word represented a concept defined by its modern virtual context. The Avatar was one of the first times that a player could select the race and gender of the protagonist, and can be interpreted as a representative of the player, allowing them to reflect on their actions in the game. However, the Avatar eventually evolved to take on a more specific appearance and character.

==== Lord British ====
Lord British is the ruler of Britannia, and an in-game personification of the creator of the series, Richard Garriott. His name comes from a nickname given to him by friends at a computer camp, who felt that his way of saying "hello" was distinctly "British." The "Lord" prefix was added when he played the dungeon master in Dungeons & Dragons games. Garriott released early games, such as Akalabeth, under the name and occasionally appeared in Ultima Online playing as Lord British. He is still known as Lord British even after his departure from Ultima maker Origin Systems: Garriott retained the trademark rights to the name Lord British with its associated symbols, and the character appeared in his latest (and now defunct) online game, Tabula Rasa as General British.

The character's near-invulnerability is one of his most renowned traits. While British is normally invincible in most game, in almost every Ultimate game he appears players have devised way to assassinate the character, later defined as the Lord British Postulate which states: "If it exists as a living creature in an MMORPG, someone, somewhere, will try to kill it." Writing for Computer and Video Games, Kieron Gillen described the phenomenon as developing from players exploiting gaps in the games’ logic into developers deliberately hiding methods for killing the character as Easter eggs. One famous incident occurred in Ultima Online, in which due to an oversight coinciding with a server crash, British was killed during the game's beta test.

==== Lord Blackthorn ====
Lord Blackthorn becomes regent of Britannia when Lord British disappears while exploring the Underworld in Ultima V. Originally, he is a wise and just ruler, but he is twisted by the Shadowlords and becomes an oppressive tyrant. By the game's conclusion, Lord British is restored to his throne and Blackthorn sent to exile through a red moongate to an unknown world. Ultima VII Part Two: Serpent Isle explains that his destination is the Serpent Isle. While on Serpent Isle, Blackthorn takes refuge among the Xenkan Monks and finds redemption, eventually joining their order. But Ultima IX diverges from this restoration of Lord Blackthorn having him leave the island before the Avatar arrives on the Serpent Island. Blackthorn returns again as a villain in Ultima IX: Ascension, this time as a servant of the Guardian, which again contradicts the restorative end on Ultima VII: Part Two: Serpent Isle. In the end Blackthorn perishes at the hand of Lord British after an extensive magical duel at the center of the Great Stygian Abyss, completely contradicting everything written prior to Ascension and after Ultima VII.

In Ultima Online, the timeline of which diverges from the main series after Ultima I, Blackthorn is the closest friend of Lord British, but at the same time he is also his fiercest enemy. He has been defending the peoples' individuality and freedom of belief by creating his own virtue, chaos. In this case, chaos does not represent the destructive force with which it is usually associated. He eventually forged an alliance with various dark magics and emerged as an evil force. After "surviving" through a few years, he was seemingly killed in an assault on the city of Yew. The evil form was later retconned into being a facsimile, and the original Lord Blackthorn became the king of Britannia. Lord Blackthorn was the virtual persona of Ultima Online project director Starr Long.

==== The Guardian ====
The Guardian is an alien being of immense power from another dimension. A large red humanoid, he is described as a conqueror of worlds. He first appears in Ultima VII: The Black Gate although for the majority of the game he is only a disembodied voice. Having conquered other worlds, he first attempts to conquer Britannia through his agent Batlin, the founder and leader of the Fellowship. The ultimate plan was to create a black moongate to allow the Guardian to physically enter Britannia and conquer it. The Avatar discovers the Guardian's plan and destroys the black moongate as the Guardian is attempting to enter.

=== Artificial scripts and language ===
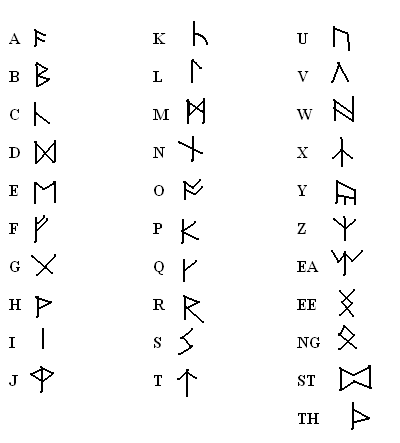
Britannian runes, loosely based on the Elder Futhark, and their Latin equivalents

The Ultima series of computer games employed several different artificial scripts. The people of Britannia, the fantasy world where the games are set, speak English, and most of the day-to-day things are written in Latin alphabet. However, there still are other scripts, which are used by tradition.

Britannian runes are the most commonly seen script. In many of the games of the series, most signs are written in runic. The runes are based on Germanic runes, but closer to Dwarven runes in Tolkien's The Lord of the Rings, which creator Richard Garriott has stated he has read. They gained steadier use since Ultima V, which was the first game in the series to use a runic font for in-game signs. Runes in earlier games were mostly found in hard copy materials, such as maps and the decorative covers of booklets. Runes appear less in Ultima VII and in later games.

Gargish is the language of the gargoyles of Britannia and the language used in spellcasting within the game. Unlike the runic script, which is usually used simply as a visual cipher for English, the Gargish script encodes a genuine constructed language, based on (but expanding greatly upon) the magical words of power that first saw use in Ultima V, as well as the mantras for each of the Shrines of Virtue, which had remained consistent since Ultima IV. The lexicon mostly comprises deformed or truncated Latinate stems (flam "fire" ← Latin flamma; lap "stone" ← Latin lapis; leg "to read" ← Latin legō), but other origins are also apparent (uis "wisdom" ← English wise; kas "helmet" ← French casque). But the grammar is de novo and bears little resemblance to Latin, being largely analytic in structure instead. Gargish uses suffixes to denote grammatical tense and aspect, and also in some forms of derivation. The Gargish alphabet is featured in Ultima VI, though it is seen only in specific game contexts. Ultima VII and onward does not feature anything written in the alphabet, with the sole exception of some books to be found in the gargoyle colony in the underwater city of Ambrosia in Ultima IX. The Gargish language and alphabet were designed by Herman Miller.

The Ophidian alphabet, featured in Ultima VII Part Two: Serpent Isle, was used by the Ophidian civilization that inhabited the Serpent Isle. It is based on various snake forms. Ophidian lettering was quite difficult to read, so the game included a Translation spell that made the letters look like Latin letters.

== Reception ==
In the United States, the first five Ultima games had collectively sold more than 470,000 copies for home computers by 1990. In Japan, total sales of Pony Canyon's Japanese versions of the Ultima series had reached nearly 100,000 copies on home computers and over 300,000 units on the Famicom (Nintendo Entertainment System), by 1990.

In 1996, Next Generation ranked the Ultima series as collectively the 55th top game of all time, commenting that, "While the graphics and playing style change with the technological leaps of the day, [it] has been the most consistent source of roleplaying excitement in history." In 1999, Next Generation listed the Ultima series as number 18 on their "Top 50 Games of All Time", commenting that, "Most PC RPGs are about hacking and slashing through anything that moves, usually while crawling through a dungeon. The Ultima series, however, has always been firmly grounded in a world where a character's virtues are as important as their armor class in determining success." In 2000, Britannia was included in GameSpot's list of the ten best game worlds, called "the oldest and one of the most historically rich gameworlds."

== Impact and legacy ==
The Ultima series helped popularize the party-based combat introduced by Wizardry. Other innovations of the early Ultimas became standard among later RPGs, such as tiled graphics, a mix of fantasy and science-fiction elements, and time travel as a plot device.

Ultima III: Exodus (1983) was particularly influential because it used a written narrative to convey a larger story. Most video games – including Garriott's own Ultima I and II and Akalabeth – tended to focus primarily on things like combat. The game influenced the development of RPGs, including Excalibur and Dragon Quest, and is considered by many to be the first modern computer role-playing game.

Ultima IV and later Ultimas used a system of chivalry and code of conduct in which the player, or "Avatar", is tested and judged by to their actions—a groundbreaking departure from other video games in which players need not consider the consequences of their actions.

The famous incident where Lord British is assassinated in Ultima Online

Lord British has been discussed as both the most recognisable character associated with the Ultima series and as a symbol of early online gaming culture. In a 2021 list for PC Gamer, Rick Lane ranked Lord British among the most iconic characters in PC gaming, describing him as the ruler of Britannia, Richard Garriott's alter ego, and "the series' most renowned character". Lord British was later included in the reference collection 100 Greatest Video Game Characters, in an entry by game scholar José P. Zagal. On the other hand, the recurring possibility of killing Lord British became one of the character’s most recognisable associations. Gillen called the Ultima Online beta assassination “arguably the most iconic” of these deaths, and noted that Tabula Rasa later staged a “Kill General British” event that explicitly drew on the same tradition. His killing during the 1997 beta test of Ultima Online was later described by GamesRadar+ writer Anne-Marie Ostler as "one of the most iconic moments in MMO history". Writing for Wired, Brad King connected the incident to early player protest culture in online games, stating that it "reverberated through the gaming world" and helped show that players could alter or challenge the social order of a virtual world. Professor Megan Winget, who studied the preservation of virtual-world history, similarly cited the murder of Lord British as an event repeatedly raised by players as personally memorable and historically significant.

=== Shroud of the Avatar: Forsaken Virtues ===
In 2009, Richard Garriott founded Portalarium, whose RPG/MMORPG Garriott has described as a spiritual successor of the Ultima series. On March 8, 2013, Portalarium launched a Kickstarter campaign for Shroud of the Avatar: Forsaken Virtues, the first of five planned games in the Shroud of the Avatar series. The game was described as a "selective multiplayer game" that allowed the player to determine his or her level of multiplayer involvement, from MMO to single-player offline. The company planned to release Forsaken Virtues in summer 2017, with Episodes 2 through 5 released annually thereafter. Instead, the first episode was released on March 27, 2018, to mixed reception. No other episodes were released.

=== Copyright reclamation ===
On June 30, 2020, Garriott said that EA had rebuffed his suggestions for reviving or remastering the Ultima series. Around June 2026, Garriott began to try to reclaim the copyright on the series from EA using a part of U.S. copyright law that allows a creator to take ownership of a work they had sold after 35 years which will occur in 2027. If Garriott regains the copyright, he could make a game with an expanded title, like Lord British's Ultima, even thought EA would still own the trademark.

== Sources ==
- Addams, Shay (December 1992). The Official Book of Ultima. COMPUTE Books. ISBN 978-0-87455-264-5.
- Barton, Matt (2007-02-23). "The History of Computer Role-Playing Games Part 1: The Early Years (1980–1983)". Gamasutra. Archived from the original on April 23, 2008.
- King, Brad; Borland, John M. (2003). Dungeons and Dreamers: The Rise of Computer Game Culture from Geek to Chic. McGraw-Hill/Osborne. ISBN 0-07-222888-1.
- McCubbin, Chris and David Ladyman (1999). Prima's Official Guide to Ultima Ascension. Rocklin, CA: Prima Publishing. ISBN 0-7615-1585-2.
- Vestal, Andrew (1998-11-02). "The History of Console RPGs". GameSpot. Archived from the original on 2009-08-02.
