= Ultima V: Warriors of Destiny =

1988 video game

- Developer: Origin Systems
- Publisher: Origin Systems
- Designers: Richard Garriott; Chris Roberts
- Artist: Denis Loubet
- Composers: Kenneth W. Arnold; Kazuo Sawa (X68000); Martin Galway (NES)
- Series: Ultima
- Platforms: Amiga, Apple II, Atari ST, Commodore 64/128, MS-DOS, FM Towns, PC-88, PC-98, NES, X68000
- Release: March 1988
- Genre: Role-playing
- Mode: Single-player

Ultima V: Warriors of Destiny is the fifth entry in the role-playing video game series Ultima released in March 1988. It is the second in the "Age of Enlightenment" trilogy. The game's story takes a darker turn from its predecessor Ultima IV. Britannia's king Lord British is missing, replaced by a tyrant named Lord Blackthorn. The player must navigate a totalitarian world bent on enforcing its virtues through draconian means.

Ultima V sports numerous advances from Ultima IV. The game world is larger, with more towns, further detailed dungeons, and an expansive Underworld to explore. Dialog with NPCs hosts more choices to make during the conversation. World interactivity is further increased with new options to search, manipulate, and explore the player's surroundings.

Ultima V was followed by Ultima VI: The False Prophet in 1990.

== Plot ==
After having mastered the eight Virtues, attaining Avatarhood, and retrieving the Codex of Ultimate Wisdom in the previous game, the Avatar is summoned back to Britannia by his old comrades Iolo and Shamino using a magic coin, which was included as a trinket in the game's box. Upon arrival he is greeted by Shamino, but they immediately come under attack from the three powerful beings known as the Shadowlords. After repelling them with the amulet (a feat that cannot be replicated later in the game), the Avatar brings the heavily wounded Shamino to Iolo's nearby hut where Iolo fills him in on recent developments: Lord British has been lost on an expedition into the Underworld, and a tyrant known as Lord Blackthorn now rules Britannia in his stead. Blackthorn enforces a strict, rigid version of the Virtues, which leads to results that are anything but virtuous (such as, "Thou shalt not lie, or thou shalt lose thy tongue", "Thou shalt donate half thy income to charity, or thou shalt have no income" or "Thou shalt enforce the laws of virtue, or thou shalt die as a heretic."), while the mysterious and terrifying Shadowlords terrorize the eight cities of Britannia.

Over the course of the game the Avatar learns that the Shadowlords sprang from three shards of Mondain's Gem of Immortality (destroyed at the conclusion of Ultima I). Representing Falsehood, Hatred and Cowardice - the antithesis for Truth, Love and Courage, the three principles of the Avatar - they have corrupted Blackthorn and subverted his rule.

With the help of his old companions and some new ones, the Avatar forms the Warriors of Destiny in order to eliminate the Shadowlords, undermine Blackthorn's rule, and rescue Lord British to restore him to his throne.

== Gameplay ==
The main overhead view of Ultima V (DOS Version). Here the player's party is leaving the keep, Empath Abbey.

Warriors of Destiny was the first Ultima to implement a time-of-day system in which the sun rises and sets, and non-player characters follow daily routine schedules.

As in Ultima IV, the player can interact with non-player characters (NPCs) by typing a word or phrase that signifies the topic to discuss. The NPCs will say what they care to share about a subject when it is mentioned, and the player can repeat key words used in the NPC's response to ask for further details. Sometimes, an NPC will ask a question of the player, and the player must give an appropriate response to keep the conversation active. As in Ultima IV, only the first four letters of player spoken text are read by the game, i.e. for 'shrine', the player need only type 'shri'.

The Shadowlords play an integral role in enforcing the oppressive atmosphere of Britannia in Ultima V. They appear at various times in different towns, and affect the townspeople. If the Shadowlord of Cowardice is about, the people will run away from the player, afraid. If under the effect of the Shadowlord of Falsehood, they will try to steal from the player. If the Shadowlord of Hatred is affecting them, they will try to attack. Later in the game, the player learns to track the movement of the Shadowlords by observing planetary orbits via a specific telescope (spyglass).

Each of the Shadowlords represents the antithesis of one of the three guiding principles: Faulinei, the Shadowlord of Falsehood opposes Truth; Astaroth, the Shadowlord of Hatred opposes Love; and Nosfentor, the Shadowlord of Cowardice opposes Courage. The Shadowlords must be defeated, but this cannot be accomplished through pure combat. First, the player must learn each Shadowlord's name by interviewing NPCs, Second, the three shards of the Gem of Immortality must be recovered from their scattered locations in the Underworld. Finally, the player must visit each of the sacred flames (the Flame of Truth at the Lycaeum, the Flame of Love at Empath Abbey, and the Flame of Courage at Serpent's Hold), summon the corresponding Shadowlord by shouting its name, lure the Shadowlord into the flame and finally destroy the shard by throwing it into the flame.

In addition to traveling by foot, the player's party can ride horses, sail ships, and row skiffs. The player can also use the eight moongates, the magical doorways that appear each night in eight locations across Britannia. Stepping through one transports the player to another moongate, determined by the phases of the two moons. Although by default the moongates are located near each of the eight major towns, it is possible to relocate the gates to other areas by digging at their location to get the moonstones they appear over. Transplanting moongates proves to be a boon later in the game when exploring the Underworld. Two additional modes of transportation, the grapple and the magic carpet, are also available. The grapple can be used to scale small mountains (though the large mountains remain impassible throughout the game.) The magic carpet is a handy way of traversing the game world, as it can float over almost any terrain (not mountains), as well as increasing the party's speed to make it easier to escape monsters. The carpet can float easily over swamp, rivers and coastal waters, but flying over deep sea waters or lava will injure the party. Both items are located by piecing together conversations from multiple NPCs and completing side quests, though with prior knowledge an experienced player can acquire both items very easily and very early in the game.

=== Runic alphabet ===
Ultima V uses a modified form of the Anglo-Saxon runic alphabet for some game text, with a one-to-one correspondence with the English alphabet. While all the earlier Ultima games since Ultima II had used runes on accompanying material such as maps and manuals and Ultima IV had shown single runes on the screen in specific situations, Ultima V was the first part of the series to incorporate multi-letter runic texts into the actual on-screen display.

== Development ==
Warriors of Destiny was the last Ultima developed on the Apple II; the limits of that system (excluding the 16-bit Apple IIGS) were increasingly becoming a hindrance to further technological advance, and thus all later games were developed on PC systems. This was also the last time in which Ultima creator Richard Garriott did a major share of the actual coding; in the later parts he acted as a game designer only. In his approach to Lord Blackthorn and his involvement in the overarching narrative, Garriott wanted to create a more insidious villain that wasn't just passively waiting for the heroes to arrive.

The use of telescopes in the game was inspired by Garriott's experience as an amateur astronomer; Garriott programmed the game to accurately depict planetary orbits.

Ultima V was also ported to the NES by Origin and, like the previous two games in the series, published through FCI; it was released as Ultima: Warriors of Destiny in 1993. Each of the NES games had significant differences from the originals; this NES version was, however, a less faithful rendition of the source material than its predecessors had been. Introductory parts were cropped, graphics and gameplay were relatively limited (a clear example is that the swamp terrain was represented by magical poison fields), and there were few music tracks. Character sprites were much less developed and movement was needlessly clunky and slow. The graphics and game engine were altogether inferior compared to the NES ports of the previous two games.

The Commodore 64 port of Ultima V came on five 1541 disks (around 1.5MB total) and was criticized for the excessive amount of disk access and swapping required, although like Ultima IV, the game can utilize two disk drives if present. When playing on a two drive system, the disk labeled "Outdoor" (also used to save/load games) is left in Drive 0 while the other game disks ("Underworld", "Towne", and "Dungeon") are placed in Drive 1 and swapped around. It also supports Commodore 128 mode and if run on a C128, the extra system RAM is used for background music that is absent when the game is played on a C64. A fan-made "remastered" version adds music in C64 mode. Ultima V also has a built-in fast loader, although as it is tied to the timing of NTSC machines, it will not work on PAL C64s, whose CPUs ran at a slightly slower clock speed, therefore European gamers without a C128 suffered from almost excruciating load times. If played in C128 mode and a 1571 drive is used, the game uses the computer's "burst mode" and does not require a fast loader.

Amiga and Atari ST versions appeared in 1989. Their graphics were directly ported from the PC, thus not utilizing the capabilities of the machines. On the Amiga, the entire soundtrack was replaced with one new composition that only appeared on that platform—the same song repeated throughout all areas of the game. On the Atari ST, the songs were played in different places from on the Apple II and Commodore 128 versions; however, all songs from those versions were reused.

All editions contained: the game media; a cloth map; a metal coin with the symbol of the Codex-as described in the game's introduction; The Book of Lore; Lord British's Odyssey; a quick reference card; a player reference card (version specific); and a registration post card.

The game box differs between editions only by screenshots on the back. The Atari ST version depicts (left to right): a giant mouse in a dungeon; the Castle British area including the player, a ship and a headless; and a battle screen with player casting 'In Flam Hur' on various skeletons. The first IBM version depicts (left to right): a fountain in a dungeon; the Castle British area including the player, a ship and a horse; and the interior of an inn. The second release for IBM shows the same screenshots as the Atari ST version.

== Reception ==
By 1990, the game had sold over 100,000 copies in the United States.

Computer Gaming World stated that "the game system and technology are strides ahead" of Ultima IV. 's The magazine's Scorpia described Ultima V as "well worth the wait", citing improved graphics and storyline. Minor criticisms were directed at flaws in the documentation and combat system. In 1993 she called the game "a worthy follow-up ... not to be missed", although criticizing the Underworld as "a disappointment, being vast but essentially empty". Compute! called V "a tour de force in the realm of computer role-playing ... but it doesn't match the elegance of IV". The game was reviewed in 1988 in Dragon #137 by Hartley, Patricia, and Kirk Lesser in "The Role of Computers" column. The reviewers gave the game 5 out of 5 stars.

Garriott claimed in 1994 that V was the high watermark of the Ultima series in terms of storytelling. In 1990 the game received the eighth-highest number of votes in a survey of Computer Gaming World readers' "All-Time Favorites". The game was ranked the 18th best game of all time by Amiga Power in 1991.

== Legacy ==
A fan-made recreation of Ultima V, titled Ultima V: Lazarus, was released on December 22, 2005 by an international team of game designers. The original plot and mechanics were recreated in the game engine of the 2002 video game Dungeon Siege, modernizing the original Ultima V with 3D graphics. This remake was reviewed positively upon release.
