= Ultima VI: The False Prophet =

1990 video game

- Developer: Origin Systems
- Publisher: Origin Systems
- Producers: Richard Garriott; Warren Spector
- Designer: Richard Garriott
- Series: Ultima
- Platforms: MS-DOS, Amiga, Atari ST, Commodore 64, FM Towns, PC-98, Super NES, X68000
- Release: April 1990: MS-DOS; 1991–1992: ports
- Genre: Role-playing
- Mode: Single player

Ultima VI: The False Prophet, released by Origin Systems in 1990, is the sixth part in the role-playing video game series of Ultima. It is the third and final game in the "Age of Enlightenment" trilogy. Ultima VI sees the player return to Britannia, at war with a race of gargoyles from another land, struggling to stop a prophecy from ending their race. The player must help defend Britannia against these gargoyles, and ultimately discover the secrets about both lands and its peoples.

Ultima VI continues to advance the technology of the Ultima series. The game world is larger, with a 1024x1024 tile map seamlessly connected and to scale. World interactivity is further increased with object manipulation, movement, and crafting. Graphics and sound are likewise advanced with the use of new sound card technology and VGA graphics cards, and the user interface is streamlined with the use of point-and-click icons.

Ultima VI was followed by Ultima VII: The Black Gate in 1992.

== Plot ==
The main overhead view of Ultima VI (MS-DOS). Here the Avatar and their party are fighting gargoyles at the beginning of the game.

Some years after Lord British has returned to power, the Avatar is captured and tied on a sacrificial altar, about to be sacrificed by red demon-like creatures, the gargoyles. Three of the Avatar's companions, Shamino, Dupre and Iolo, suddenly appear, save the Avatar and collect the sacred text the gargoyle priest was holding.

The Avatar's party flees through a moongate to Castle Britannia, and three of the gargoyles follow. The game begins with the player fighting the gargoyles in Lord British's throne room. After the battle, the Avatar learns that the shrines of Virtue were captured by the gargoyles and he embarks on a quest to rescue Britannia from the invaders.

It is only later in the game that the Avatar learns that the whole situation looks rather different from the point of view of the gargoyles – indeed, they even have their own system of virtues. The quest for victory over the gargoyles now turns into a quest for peace with them.

== Gameplay ==
This game ended the use of multiple scales; in earlier games a town, castle, or dungeon would be represented as a single symbol on the world map, which then expanded into a full sub-map when entering the structure. In Ultima VI, the whole game uses a single scale, with towns and other places seamlessly integrated into the main map; dungeons are now also viewed from the same perspective as the rest of the game, rather than the first-person perspective used by Ultima I-V. The game retained the basic tile system and screen layout of the three preceding games, but utilized a much more colourful and detailed oblique map view and displayed NPC portraits during conversations. These changes took full advantage of the recently released VGA graphics cards for PCs.

== Development ==
The development of the Ultima series originated on the Apple II and every prior game had been developed primarily on that platform. By 1990 the market for 8-bit computers in the US had nearly evaporated, so there was no Apple II version for the first time. A version for the 16-bit Apple IIGS had been planned, and rumored to have been started, but was never released (despite mentions of the machine on the box packaging and manual). The game was ported to the Commodore 64, although not without trimming considerable trimming of aesthetics (no portraits) and gameplay (no horses, no working gems, reduced NPC dialogs, simplified quests, etc.).

Major changes were made that distinguished Ultima VI from earlier Ultima games. Several of these changes were influenced by Origin's 1988 action role-playing game, Times of Lore, created by Chris Roberts, and FTL Games's 1987 RPG Dungeon Master. One such change was the world design, where no longer would towns and castles be represented by icons on the overworld map, but where everything in the game world is represented on the same 1024 × 1024 tile map, except for dungeons and smaller outdoor maps. The caverns and dungeons beneath the land were also no longer represented in first-person view, but changed to an overhead, oblique isometric view, like the rest of the game. Another such change was the incorporation of some real-time elements. Richard Garriott also based the game's new icon-based point and click interface on Times of Lore, streamlining the commands into ten icons. Garriott expressed annoyance at not having thought of it sooner, realizing that "it was clearly the way to have gone" for earlier games.

The software routines that governed every element of movement and combat was developed by 25 year-old Boston programmer Herman Miller, who previously wrote the MS-DOS conversions of Ultima V and Times of Lore. The conversation system, the means by which the player talks with characters, was developed by 26 year-old Chinese programmer Cheryl Chen, who developed her own programming language for the game called UCS (Ultima VI conversation system). Conversations with townspeople were no longer restricted in terms of length, compared to the limitations of earlier Ultima games.

It was one of the first games directly targeted to IBM PC compatibles with VGA graphics and a mouse. The game supported sound cards for music as well, which were not yet common when it was released. Other sound effects, such as the clashing of swords, magical zaps, or explosions, were still played through the PC speaker. The Amiga version was itself ported from the PC and due to a lack of reprogramming it was very slow and generally considered unplayable without accelerator card on a first- or second-generation Amiga.

A port of the game for Fujitsu's FM Towns platform was made primarily for the Japanese market. This CD-ROM-based version included full speech in both English and Japanese. Remarkably, in this particular version voice acting was recorded at Origin under the direction of Martin Galway, mostly by the people the characters were based on (with Richard Garriott as Lord British, Greg Dykes as Dupre, Chuck Buche as Chuckles, etc.), though not all personnel could be reached at the time of recording, so some substitutes were used.

The game came with a cloth map of Britannia and a Moonstone made from a black colored bit of glass. Slightly improved versions of the Ultima VI engine were also used for the Worlds of Ultima spin-off series.

Origin produced a deluxe edition of Ultima VI for sale by mail order at the same $69.95 price as the retail version. Lord British autographed the copies, which contained an audio interview with him, game hints, and higher-quality moonstone.

Fan-made patches and remakes exist for many Ultima games. This is the Nuvie engine which provides several upgrades to Ultima VI.

== Reception ==
Reception

Review scores
Publication	Score
Zzap!64	98%
Dragon	5/5 (MS-DOS); 3/5 (SNES)
The One	91% (Amiga)

Award
Publication	Award
Computer Gaming World	Role-Playing Game of the Year 1990 (Nominated), inducted into CGW Hall of Fame

In 1990, the game had sold under 100,000 copies in the United States.

Scorpia of Computer Gaming World in 1990 stated that she "had some profound, mixed feelings about" Ultima VI because of the changes to the user interface, graphics, and gameplay. The change to a single scale for the world, for example, greatly increased travel and exploration time; long quests had small rewards; and performance became sluggish with many characters on screen. She liked, however, the "solid story" that elegantly concluded the second trilogy, lack of pointless outdoor encounters, and improved NPC dialogues, and concluded that Ultima VI "is a very good game". In 1993, Scorpia criticized the middle of the game and the hunt for the pirate map, but stated that it was "definitely worth your time".

Dragon gave the MS-DOS version 5 out of 5 stars, but only 3 out of 5 stars for the Super NES version. The editors of Strategy Plus named Ultima VI the best role-playing game of 1990. However, Editor-in-Chief Brian Walker wrote at the time, "If any genre is in need of a shake up, this is surely it. Like wargames, role-playing games are suffering from too literal conversions of the pen and paper systems." He argued that the genre had become bland and repetitive, and remarked that "Ultima VI took role-playing as far it could go within these [usual] parameters, offering as it did, brilliant graphics and a consistent world."

The One gave the Amiga version of Ultima VI an overall score of 91%, criticising the amount of disk swapping throughout the game, and that to begin the game "you have to decompact the game to four spare floppies", further frustrated by the fact that this process needs to be repeated if the player creates a new character. The One furthermore states that "Ultima VI is not a fast game by any means and the frequent disk accessing and swapping makes two drives a necessity", but goes on to say that "given Ultima VI's incredible scale and scope it's a miracle that it made it onto the Amiga at all." The One praises Ultima VI's size, gameplay, and design, expressing that "There's no other RPG that comes within a mile of matching Ultima VI's huge depth and amazingly real atmosphere."

Computer Gaming World nominated Ultima VI for its 1990 "Role-Playing Game of the Year" award, which went to Starflight 2: Trade Routes of the Cloud Nebula. The magazine highlighted Ultima VI's "interesting and important story, dynamite graphics ... and incredible detail". In 1992, Computer Gaming World added Ultima VI to the magazine's Hall of Fame for games that readers highly rated over time. In 1996 the magazine ranked it as the 44th best game of all time, stating that Ultima VI "hit new heights in virtuality with the defined objects in the game world" and "also presented a brilliant treatise on the danger of prejudice".

== Legacy ==
A fan-made recreation of Ultima VI using the Dungeon Siege engine, The U6 Project (aka Archon), was released on 5 July 2010. Another remake project uses the Exult engine, using graphics from Ultima VII. Ultima 6 Online is an MMO version of Ultima VI.
