= Mod Archive =

English-language website dedicated to the archival of module files

- Website type: Module file digital library
- Available in: English
- Founders: Morgan Green; Patrick Nelson; Chris Tchou; Robert Watson
- Website: modarchive.org
- Commercial: No, accepts donations
- Launched: February 1996; 30 years ago
- Current status: Active
- Content license: Public domain or Creative Commons licenses, if mentioned by the uploader

The Mod Archive is a website dedicated to the indexing and archival of playable music module files. It allows anyone to upload modules, and provides charts, reviews and ratings of music files based on a community effort.

== Formats ==
- MOD
- IT
- XM
- AHX
- MED
- STM
- STX
- S3M
- MO3
- MTM
- 669
- AMF
- AMS
- DBM
- DIGI
- DMF
- DSM
- DSym
- FAR
- FMT
- GDM
- IMF
- J2B
- MDL
- MPTM
- MT2
- OKT
- PLM
- PTM
- STM
- SymMOD
- ULT
- HVL

== History ==
The Mod Archive was established in February 1996 as a place for tracker artists to upload their work. Since then, the site has emerged into being a community for artists and module enthusiasts.

In an effort to make the website more dynamic, the community part of the site was added around 2000, in the form of message boards and an indexed search engine. Having lacked proper maintenance since around 2004, however, the site went through a complete reimplementation, beginning in November 2005 and leaving private beta in August 2006. In 2007, the site moved onto dedicated hardware to cope with a sudden increase in popularity following these improvements.

Since 2006, the site has also provided a method of doing bulk downloads of archive files via BitTorrent.

== Operations and quality control ==
Having moved from a sponsored, shared platform in 2007, the website currently resides on a dedicated server. As a result of the increased costs related to running on dedicated hardware, the site seeks the help of the community in covering the running costs.

Since anyone can upload files to the website, all uploaded files have to go through a manual screening process where they are checked for integrity and quality by site staff.

Reusing the tracker music files published on the website requires the song's author permission.

== Mentions in publications ==
ModArchive was mentioned in the PC music freeware roundup in Sound on Sound magazine.

ModArchive (v3.1) was featured as Site of the Month in Computer Music magazine.
