= List of Amiga music format players =

This is a list of software for various operating systems for playing Amiga music formats.

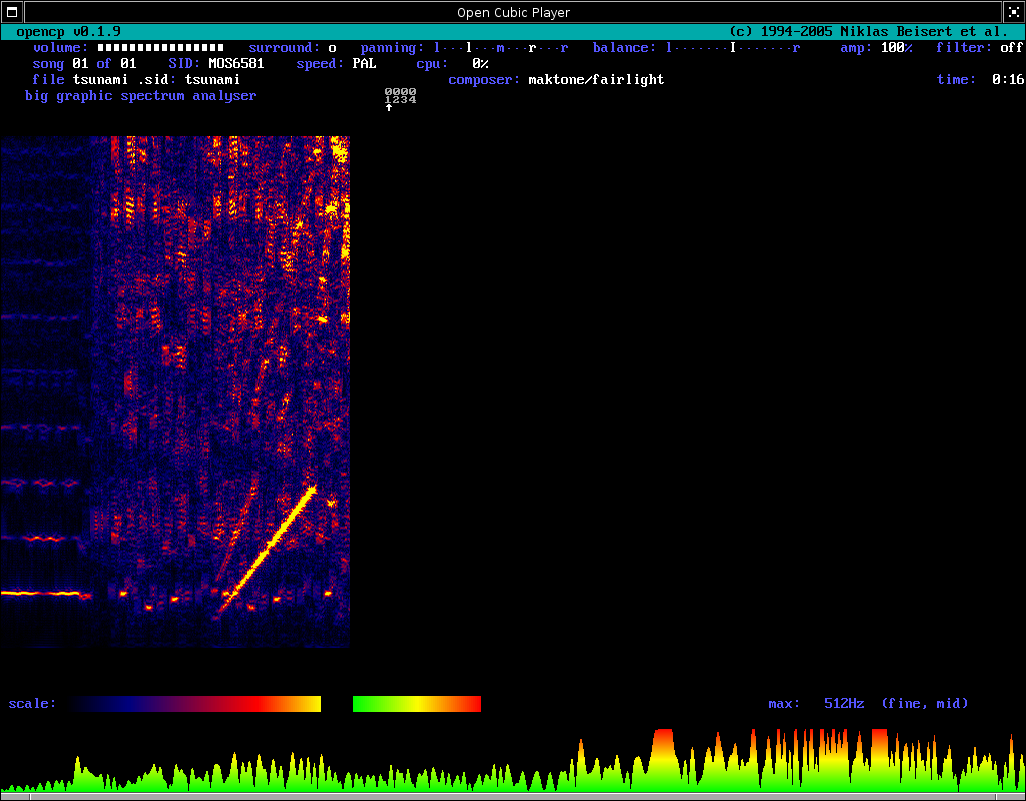
OpenCubic Player, an example of a typical MOD player with visualization (STFT, spectrum etc.)

- Audacious – various third party plug-ins have been written to play Amiga formats
- Clementine
- Foobar2000 – various third party plug-ins have been written to play Amiga formats
- HelenOS – includes a module player application named modplay
- MikMod
- ModPlug Player
- TiMidity
- Unix Amiga Delitracker Emulator - An Open Source player for Amiga formats that uses emulation and custom software
- VLC Media Player
- Winamp – various third party plug-ins have been written to play Amiga formats
- XMMS – various third party plug-ins have been written to play Amiga formats
- XMPlay
- uFMOD – free XM library and player for Windows, Linux, FreeBSD and KolibriOS

== See also ==
- MOD (file format)
- Module file, Tracker file
