= Impulse Tracker =

Free music sequencing software created in 1995 for the DOS platform

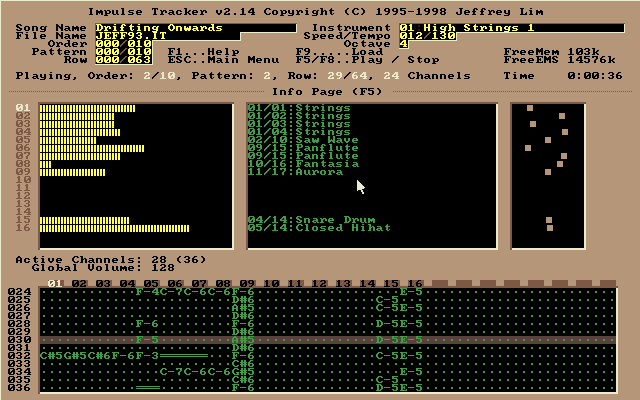
- Impulse Tracker 2.14 screenshot
- Developer: Jeffrey Lim
- Release: 1995; 31 years ago
- Stable release: 2.14 Patch #5 / 8 April 1999; 27 years ago
- Written in: Assembly language
- Operating system: DOS
- Type: Music tracker
- License: Originally freeware Since 2014: BSD license
- Website: www.lim.com.au/ImpulseTracker/
- Repository: github.com/jthlim/impulse-tracker

Impulse Tracker is a multi-track music tracker (music sequencer). Originally released in 1995 by Jeffrey Lim as freeware with commercial extensions, it was one of the last tracker programs for the DOS platform.

In 2014, on its 20th anniversary, Impulse Tracker became open-source software and the source code was released.

== History ==
Impulse Tracker was authored by Jeffrey "Pulse" Lim for the DOS/x86-PC platform. Impulse Tracker was coded in assembly language, and the GUI was heavily influenced by that of Scream Tracker 3.

The first version was released in 1995 and included example songs "Drifting Onwards" and "Blue Flame" composed by Jeffrey Lim and Chris Jarvis respectively. The software was distributed as freeware, though extra features, such as support for stereo WAV output and a personalized version of the driver for co-editing songs over IPX networks, were provided for a fee. After the stereo WAV writer plugin was leaked publicly, Lim announced that he would discontinue development after version 2.14. The latest version was v2.14 Patch #5 released on April 8, 1999.

On February 16, 2014, Jeffrey Lim announced that he would release the complete source code of Impulse Tracker as part of its 20-year anniversary. On October 19, 2014, the first part of the source code was released on a Bitbucket repository. On December 25, 2014, the missing parts (sound drivers) were added and the code was officially released under the BSD license.

== Functionality ==
Like in most module editors, music is arranged on a grid of channels. Each supports note on and note off instructions similar to MIDI. Impulse Tracker modules use the .IT file extension.

New Note Actions (NNAs) is a feature that handles commands received on the same channel as another instrument which is still playing. NNAs allow the user to customize the subsequent action:

- Cut: The new instrument replaces the current instrument.
- Continue: The old instrument continues to play using its ADSR curve.
- Off: The old instrument begins the release section of its ADSR curve.
- Fade: The old instrument fades out to 0 volume at a designated rate overriding the ADSR curve.

Impulse Tracker supports hardware MIDI channels on the Gravis Ultrasound, InterWave and Sound Blaster 32 card families (provided enough RAM is available).

=== IT file format ===
The .IT file format is the format native to Impulse Tracker. It is similar to older formats such as .MOD, but features new additions such as new note actions which allow the user to customize subsequent actions on receiving commands from the same channel as the one playing.

There is also the .ITZ format, which is a renamed zip file that contains a .IT file.

== Compatible software ==
Other music-playing software that supports the IT file format include:

- JetAudio – A freeware audio player for Windows which supports .IT files
- AIMP
- Windows Media Player – supports .IT files as long as the player version is x86 (32-bit). The UWP version dropped support for .IT files.
- MikMod
- OpenMPT – An open-source audio module tracker for Windows which supports .IT files and others, such as .MOD, .S3M, and XM.
- Renoise
- Schism Tracker
- ChibiTracker
- XMPlay – A freeware audio player for Windows which supports .IT files
- TiMidity
- VLC media player – An open-source media player for Windows, Linux, & macOS which supports .IT files
- Winamp – A proprietary audio player for Microsoft which supports .IT files
- XMMS
- Audacious
- foobar2000 – A freeware audio player for Windows that supports .IT files through a plugin.

* - Supported only under IA-32 releases.

== Usage and impact ==
Erez Eizen of Infected Mushroom and Shiva Shidapu composed his first trance music on Impulse Tracker. Ian Stocker used IT with other software in his collaboration for the music in the Nintendo DS version of The Sims 2.

The video games Pocket Tanks and Grid Wars use the IT format for some of their songs. Various games by Epic Games such as the first Unreal and Unreal Tournament as well as Deus Ex used the IT format in a "UMX" container format.

The video game composer and demoscener Andrew Sega (Necros) used Impulse Tracker extensively in his demoscene days.

C418 began making music in Impulse Tracker, before moving to eJay, MTV Music Generator and eventually Ableton Live, which he used to compose the Minecraft soundtrack.

Trance producer Sean Tyas began his music production career using Impulse Tracker. Electronic rock musician Blue Stahli has revealed to have used Impulse Tracker and other trackers in the past.

Deadmau5's career began in the mid-1990s with a chiptune and demoscene movements-influenced sound with Impulse Tracker.

Machinedrum used Impulse Tracker for many years before switching to Ableton Live.

== See also ==
- ScreamTracker
- FastTracker 2
- List of audio trackers
