= ModPlug =

ModPlug is the name for the series of computer software for creating and playing module files, originally developed by Olivier Lapicque.

- ModPlug Player, a module player developed in conjunction with the original ModPlug Tracker project and the original ModPlug browser plugin
- ModPlug Tracker, now known as OpenMPT
- LibModplug (decoding engine) public domain software for the open source multimedia framework GStreamer
