= S3M =

- Filename extension: .s3m
- Internet media type: audio/s3m
- Magic number: "SCRM" (4 characters) at offset 44
- Developed by: Sami Tammilehto
- Initial release: 1994-04-18
- Type of format: Module file format
- Extended from: STM, MOD

S3M (Scream Tracker 3 Module) is a module file format, the successor to the STM format used by the original Scream Tracker. Both formats are based on the original MOD format used on the Amiga computer.

The S3M format has many differences compared to its predecessors.

- The format is a hybrid of digital playback and synthesized instruments. The official format specification document covers space for 16 digital channels and 14 synthesized ones with two unused slots out of a total of 32.
- Separate volume channel in pattern data.
- Supports more instruments than MOD or STM (99 instead of 31).
- Default panning of channels can be specified by the composer.
- Extra-fine pitch slides are added
- Instruments are not limited to a fixed sample rate for a given note. The format stores the instrument's sample rate at middle C.

The period table used by S3M is smaller than the one used by the MOD format (only 12 entries, compared to between 36 and 60 for the MOD variations) and uses larger values in order to be able to compute the extra-fine pitch slides. The playback routines, however, use relatively straightforward formulas to get the final period values used in playback. The key formula for this takes into account the instrument's stored sample rate at middle C.

One feature of the S3M format which is seldom used, is the format's support for FM instruments. These were designed to be played back on sound cards that included an OPL2 or compatible FM synthesis chip. More recently, with the necessary CPU power available, it is possible to perform the same synthesis in software. Two examples of such software are the Adplug plugin for the Windows audio player Winamp and the open-source audio module tracker OpenMPT as of version 1.28.01.00.

== Media player support ==
S3M files released on the demoscene's music scene in the 1990s were commonly played on PCs using dedicated mod/s3m players (such as DMP) or using the tracker software (like Scream Tracker). Some more-common/contemporary music players can play these files, although fidelity to original sound and results can vary according to the individual file.

Software includes:

- foobar2000 – A freeware audio player for Windows that supports .S3M files through a plugin.
- VLC media player – An open-source media player for Windows, Linux, & macOS which supports .S3M files
- XMPlay – A freeware audio player for Windows which supports .S3M files
- AIMP
- Winamp – A proprietary audio player for Microsoft which supports .S3M files
- JetAudio – A freeware audio player for Windows which supports .S3M files
- Windows Media Player – supports .S3M files as long as the player version is x86 (32-bit). The UWP version dropped support for .S3M files.
- MusicBee – A freeware audio player for Windows which supports .S3M files
- OpenMPT – An open-source audio module tracker for Windows which supports .S3M files and others, such as .MOD, .XM, and IT.
- Audacious
- XMMS
- MikMod
- Schism Tracker
- ChibiTracker
- TiMidity
- K-Lite Codec Pack ("Mega" version only)

== See also ==
- Module file
