= AudioSim =

Synthesizer introduced in 1996

AudioSim is a virtual analog software synthesizer. It was released in 1996 by the German-Hungarian software company Audio Simulation. It was first available for MS-DOS and supported SoundBlaster or Gravis Ultrasound Sound cards.

== Description ==
AudioSim contains 2 oscillators, 4 envelope generators, 2 LFOs and a self oscillating multimode filter. The parameters of the different modules are adjustable in real-time via the GUI using the mouse. The program also has MIDI support for Gravis Ultrasound and SoundBlaster cards.

== Version 2.0 ==
- MIDI support for Sound Blaster cards
- Additional MIDI card support for use when using a buggy Sound Blaster MIDI
- Additional SINE waveform & PORTAMENTO to achieve more vintage sound
- Ring modulator usable parallel with synchronization and FM modulation
- Echo FX engine with delay & decay time

== See also ==
- Software synthesizer
