= FTII =

FTII may refer to:

- Film and Television Institute of India
- Fellow of the Chartered Institute of Taxation, in the United Kingdom
- FastTracker 2, a music tracker
