= MO3 =

Tracker music file format

MO3 is a tracker module file format developed by Ian Luck for the BASSMOD engine. MO3 files contain samples encoded in the MP3 or Ogg Vorbis formats, rather than straight PCM samples. This results in reduced file size for the module, while maintaining almost identical audio quality. Lossless audio encoding is also supported, for samples that do not compress well with lossy encoding.

== See also ==
- XMF (Extensible Music Format)
- XMPlay, an audio player that supports MO3 files
- Windows Media Player, an audio player that supports MO3 files
- OpenMPT is a tracker that can open and edit (but not save) MO3 files
