= Scream Tracker =

Audio tracker for DOS

- Scream Tracker 3.21 screenshot
- Original author: Sami Tammilehto
- Developer: Future Crew (FC)
- Release: 1990; 36 years ago (Scream Tracker 2.2)
- Final release: 3.21 / 1994; 32 years ago
- Written in: C and assembly
- Operating system: DOS
- Type: Tracker
- License: Freeware

Scream Tracker is a tracker (an integrated multi-track step sequencer and sampler as a software application). It was created by Psi (Sami Tammilehto), one of the founders of the Finnish demogroup Future Crew. It was written in C and assembly language.

The first version (1.0) had monophonic 4-bit output via the PC speaker, as well as 8-bit output via Covox's Speech Thing (a digital-to-analog converter using the parallel port) or a Sound Blaster 1.x card.

The first popular version of Scream Tracker, version 2.2, was published in 1990. Versions prior to 3.0 created STM (Scream Tracker Module) files, while versions 3.0 and above used the S3M (ScreamTracker 3 Module) format.

As of version 3.0, Scream Tracker supports up to 99 8-bit samples, 32 channels, 100 patterns, and 256 order positions. It can also handle up to 9 FM-synthesis channels on sound cards using the popular OPL2/3/4 chipsets, and, unusually, can play PCM samples and FM instruments at the same time. There are channels referred to as R1..8, L1..8 and A1..9 to be assigned to those 32 ones, which gives an effective amount of only 25 channels. 16-position free panning is available using the S8x command, but only on the Gravis Ultrasound. The usage of the A channels requires the presence of an AdLib-compatible card either by itself or alongside another sound card.

The last version of Scream Tracker was 3.21, released in 1994, placing it in competition with FastTracker 2. It was the precursor of the PC tracking scene and its interface inspired newer trackers like Impulse Tracker. Various other trackers (such as Impulse Tracker or OpenMPT) adopted the use of the Scream Tracker's S3M format.

== See also ==
- MilkyTracker
- List of audio trackers
