= Protracker =

Amiga music tracker

- Screenshot of Protracker 3.62, playing a module file called "physical presence" by artist Jogeir Liljedahl.
- Original authors: Lars Hamre, Anders Hamre, Sven Vahsen, Rune Johnsrud
- Release: 1990; 36 years ago
- Stable release: 3.62 / 1996; 30 years ago
- Preview release: 4.0 Beta 2 / 1997; 29 years ago
- Operating system: AmigaOS, Atari TOS
- Platform: Amiga, Atari ST
- Type: Tracker
- License: Freeware

Protracker is a music tracker for the Amiga platform. A freeware tool that required no additional equipment, it became popular in the early 1990s with both amateurs and professionals, allowing for sample-based music in the MOD file format.

== Introduction ==
Protracker allows the user to create sequences of notes called "patterns", which are chained together to form a complete song. Music created in Protracker uses the MOD file format.

It was initially developed for the Amiga line of computers, but was later made available for other platforms such as the Atari ST.

The Protracker was among other trackers, the descendant of the Soundtracker (1988/1987).

== Features ==
Building upon the features of previous trackers such as Ultimate Soundtracker and NoiseTracker (of which Protracker's code is based on), Protracker came equipped with a built-in sample editor and a keyboard split function to assign multiple instruments to different regions of the keyboard. Later versions also extended the MOD format by increasing the maximum number of patterns from 64 to 99, and adding a number of additional effects.

Protracker is capable of playing back music at the correct speed on both NTSC and PAL models. Previous tracker software used playback routines which were synchronized to the refresh rate of the screen, which would cause music composed on one standard to sound incorrect on computers of the other standard due to the differing refresh rates.

== Open source remake ==
There is an ongoing effort since 2010 to make an open source software clone of Protracker for modern platforms, named "ProTracker 2.3D clone", on GitHub. It is being developed under the BSD 3-Clause License and available for Windows, Linux, and macOS.

== See also ==
- List of Tracker Software
