= Digital sound file formats using the .snd extension =

Digital audio file format

SND (SouND) file is a file extension that indicates that the file is a digital sound file.

== File contents ==
Most commonly a .snd file contains a NeXT sound file. This is essentially the same as the au file format used by Sun Microsystems. The first four bytes of a .snd file contain the hex number 0x2e736e64 which displays as ".snd" when interpreted as ASCII text.

Another .snd file format is attributed to Apple Inc. Data stored in such files are commands for the Macintosh Sound Manager including 'wavetable' sample-based instruments and sound samples. It can serve as a pure audio file format if only one command and one sound sample is stored in it. In this format, the first two bytes specify a 16-bit integer representing the numbers 1 or 2.

Programs supporting audio files with the .snd extension generally assume, and check, that it is NeXT/SUN (AU) format.

Electronic music instrument manufacturer Akai had an audio file format with the extension .snd. The first byte contains the number 1 and the second the number 4.

The manufacturer of the HOM-BOT Robot Vacuum Cleaner LG Group and the VTech V.Flash use audio files with the extension .snd. The sounds are encoded in PCM (single channel, 16 kHz, 16 bits signed).

The Unity Game Engine uses a compressed format called .snd for sound packages.

== See also ==
- Au file format
