= XM (file format) =

Module file format native to FastTracker 2

- Filename extension: .xm
- Internet media type: audio/xm
- Magic number: 0x1A at offset 37
- Developed by: Fredrik Huss (Mr.H of Triton)
- Initial release: 1994
- Type of format: Module file format
- Extended from: MOD

XM, standing for "extended module", is an audio file type introduced by Triton's FastTracker 2. XM introduced multisampling-capable instruments with volume and panning envelopes, sample looping and basic pattern compression. It also expanded the available effect commands and channels, added 16-bit sample support, and offered an alternative frequency table for portamentos.

XM is a common format for many module files.

The file format has been initially documented by its creator in the file XM.TXT, which accompanied the 2.08 release of FastTracker 2, as well as its latest known beta version: 2.09b. The file, written in 1994 and attributed to Mr.H of Triton (Fredrik Huss), bears the header "The XM module format description for XM files version $0104." The contents of the file have been posted on this article's Talk subpage for reference.

This documentation is however said to be incomplete and insufficient to properly recreate the behaviour of the original program. The MilkyTracker project has expanded the documentation of the XM file format, in an attempt to replicate not only the behaviour of the original software but also its quirks. Their documentation of the XM file format is available on the project's GitHub repository.

OXM (oggmod) is a subformat, which compresses the XM samples using Vorbis.

== Supporting media players ==
- Windows Media Player – supports .XM files as long as the player version is x86 (32-bit). The UWP version dropped support for .XM files.
- JetAudio – A freeware audio player for Windows which supports .XM files
- XMPlay – A freeware audio player for Windows which supports .XM files
- foobar2000 – A freeware audio player for Windows that supports .XM files through a plugin.
- VLC media player – An open-source media player for Windows, Linux, & macOS which supports .XM files
- MusicBee – A freeware audio player for Windows which supports .XM files
- OpenMPT – An open-source audio module tracker for Windows which supports .XM files and others, such as .MOD, .S3M, and IT.
- Audacious
- Winamp – A proprietary audio player for Microsoft which supports .XM files
- AIMP
- MikMod
- Renoise
- Schism Tracker
- ChibiTracker
- TiMidity

== See also ==
- Module file
- MOD (file format)
- S3M (file format)
- IT (file format)
