= Audacious (software) =

Free and open source audio player

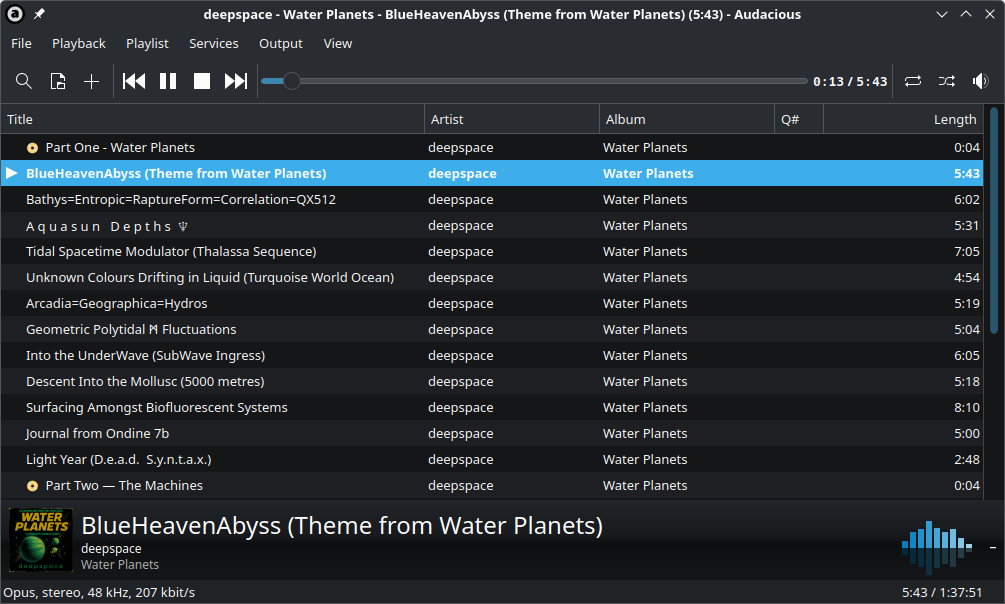
- Audacious 4.5
- Release: October 24, 2005; 20 years ago
- Stable release: 4.6.1 / 7 June 2026; 3 months ago
- Written in: Originally in C99 and GTK, rewritten in C++11 and Qt at v3.6
- Operating system: Unix-like, Windows XP and newer
- Type: Audio player software
- License: Since 3.3: BSD-2-Clause; 1.4 to 3.2.4: GPL-3.0-only; 1.3 to 1.3.2: GPL-2.0-only; 0.1 to 1.2.2: GPL-2.0-or-later
- Website: audacious-media-player.org
- Repository: github.com/audacious-media-player/audacious

Audacious is a free and open-source audio player software with a focus on low resource use, high audio quality, and support for a wide range of audio formats. It is designed primarily for use on POSIX-compatible Unix-like operating systems, with limited support for Microsoft Windows.

Audacious was the default audio player in Ubuntu Studio in 2011–12, and was the default music player in Lubuntu until October 2018, when it was replaced with VLC.

== History ==
Audacious began as a fork of Beep Media Player, which itself is a fork of XMMS. Ariadne "kaniini" Conill decided to fork Beep Media Player after the original development team announced that they were stopping development in order to create a next-generation version called BMPx. According to the Audacious home page, Conill and others "had [their] own ideas about how a player should be designed, which [they] wanted to try in a production environment."

Since version 2.1, Audacious includes both the Winamp-like interface known from previous versions and a new, GTK-based interface known as GTKUI, which resembles foobar2000 to some extent. GTKUI became the default interface in Audacious 2.4.

=== Change to C++ and Qt ===
Before version 3.0, Audacious used the GTK 2.x toolkit by default. Partial support for GTK3 was added in version 2.5, and Audacious 3.0 has full support for GTK3 and uses it by default. However, dissatisfied with the evolution of GTK3, the Audacious team chose to revert to GTK2 starting with the 3.6 release, with long-term plans of porting to Qt.

Since August 8, 2018, GTK3 support was dropped completely.

As of version 4.0, Audacious is using Qt as its primary toolkit but GTK 2.x support is still available.

As of version 4.3, Audacious has reinstated GTK3 support.

== Features ==
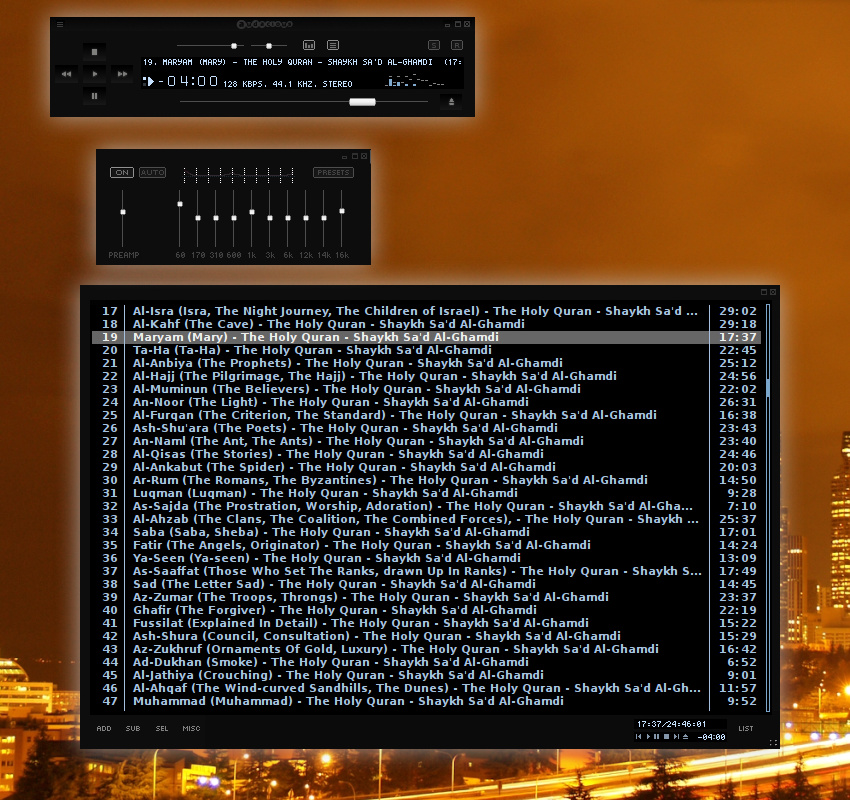
Audacious with Winamp-like interface running on Ubuntu 8.04

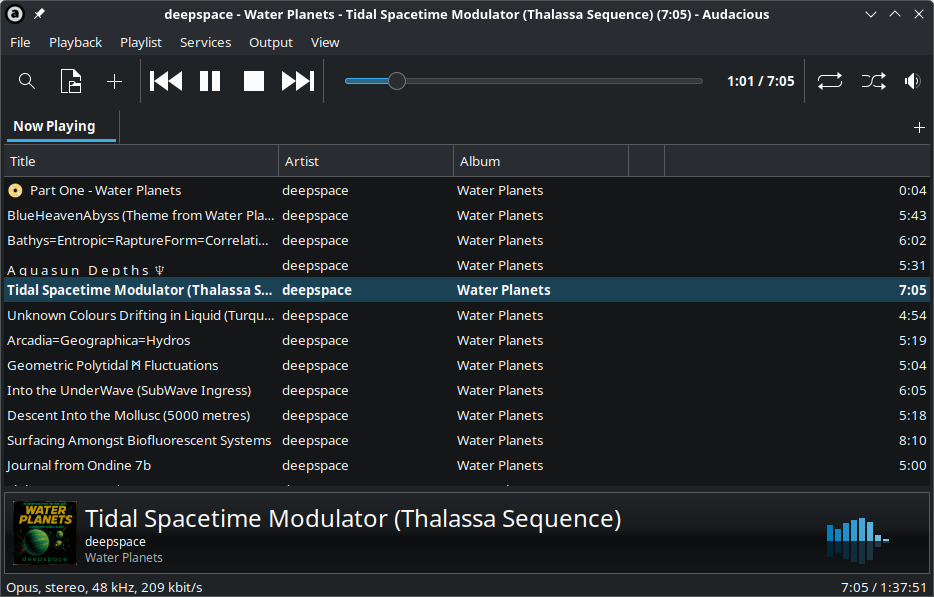
Audacious 4.5, GTK3 interface

Audacious contains built-in gapless playback.

=== Default codec support ===
- MP3 using libmpg123
- Advanced Audio Coding (AAC and AAC+)
- Vorbis
- FLAC
- Opus
- Wavpack
- Shorten (SHN)
- Musepack
- TTA (codec)
- Windows Media Audio (WMA)
- Apple Lossless (ALAC)
- 150 different module formats via libopenmpt and libmodplug
- Several chiptune formats: AY, GBS, GYM, HES, KSS, NSF, NSFE, SAP, SPC, VGM, VGZ, VTX
- PlayStation Audio: Portable Sound Format (PSF and PSF2)
- Nintendo DS Sound Format: 2SF
- Ad-lib chiptunes via AdPlug library
- WAV formats provided by libsndfile plug-in.
- MIDI via native OS synthesizer control or FluidSynth.
- CD Audio

=== Plug-ins ===
Audacious owes a large portion of its functionality to plug-ins, including all codecs. More features are available via third-party plug-ins.

Current versions of the Audacious core classify plug-ins as follows (some are low level and not user-visible at this time):

- Decoder plug-ins, which contain the actual codecs used for decoding content.
- Transport plug-ins, which are lowlevel and implemented by the VFS layer.
- General plug-ins, which provide user-added services to the player (such as sending tracks with AudioScrobbler)
- Output plug-ins, which provide the audio system backend of the player.
- Visualization plug-ins, which provide visualizations based on fast Fourier transforms of the wave data.
- Effect plug-ins, which provide various sound processing on the decoded audio stream
- Container plug-ins, which provide support for playlists and other similar structures.
- Lowlevel plug-ins, which provide miscellaneous services to the player core and are not categorized into any of the other plug-ins.
- Output plug-ins:
  - PulseAudio output
  - OSS4 output
  - ALSA output
  - Sndio output
  - SDL output
  - FileWriter plug-in – no sound is played, the output is instead redirected into a new file: this plug-in supports the output file formats: WAV, mp3, Ogg Vorbis and FLAC, it can be used to transcode a file and also to rip a CD
  - JACK output
  - PipeWire output

=== Skins ===
Audacious has full support for Winamp 2 skins, and as of version 1.2, some free-form skinning is possible. Winamp .wsz skin files, a type of Zip archive, can be used directly, or can be unarchived to individual directories. The program can use Windows Bitmap (.bmp) graphics from the Winamp archive, although native skins for Linux are usually rendered in Portable Network Graphics (.png) format. Audacious 1.x allows the user to adjust the RGB color balance of any skin, effectively making a basic white skin equivalent to a host of colorized skins without editing them manually.

=== Clients ===
Audacious is intended to be a standalone media player not a server (unlike XMMS2), though it accepts connections from client software, such as Conky.

Connection to Audacious for remote control can be done over plain DBus, by using an MPRIS-compatible client, or using the official Audtool utility created just for this purpose.

== See also ==
- Comparison of free software for audio § Players
