= OpenMPT =

Open source module tracker

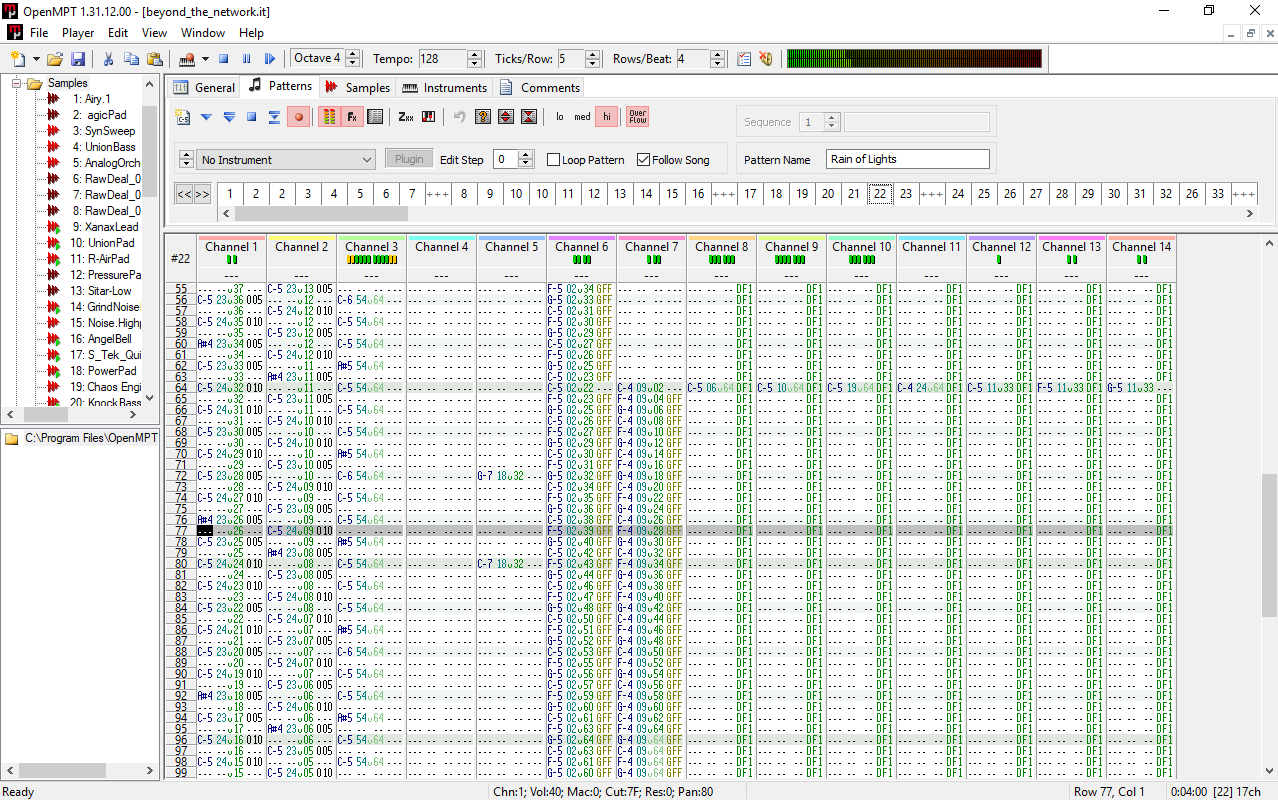
- OpenMPT 1.31.12.00 on Windows 10
- Original author: Olivier Lapicque
- Release: 1997; 29 years ago
- Stable release: 1.32.12.00 / 31 October 2026; 11 days ago
- Written in: C++
- Operating system: Windows (Unix-like operating systems via Wine)
- Platform: x86, x86-64, AArch64
- Available in: English
- Type: Tracker
- License: BSD-3-Clause (since OpenMPT 1.17.02.53) / GPL-2.0-or-later, partly public domain software
- Website: openmpt.org
- Repository: source.openmpt.org

OpenMPT is an open-source music tracker for Windows. It is based on ModPlug Tracker by Olivier Lapicque, first released in September 1997. Although developed for Windows, OpenMPT can be run on Unix-like systems via Wine.

Computer Music magazine listed OpenMPT among the top five free music trackers in 2007, and it is one of the most widely used trackers.

== History ==
=== MOD Plugin and ModPlug Tracker ===
OpenMPT was initially developed as a browser plug-in called MOD Plugin, which enabled users to play music and other sounds encoded in module files. ModPlug Tracker, along with a player application named ModPlug Player, evolved from this plug-in.

In December 1999, Olivier Lapicque sent the module-playing parts of ModPlug Tracker's source code to Kenton Varda, under the GPL-2.0-or-later, to write a plugin for XMMS based on the code. In 2001, the source code was released in the public domain, and the mod-playing code was split off into a separate library, libmodplug, maintained as part of the ModPlug XMMS Plugin project. This project lay dormant from late 2003 until early 2006, when it was picked up again. Today, libmodplug is included in many Linux distributions as a default audio plugin for playing module files and is a part of the popular open source multimedia framework gstreamer.

Due to lack of time, Olivier Lapicque discontinued development of ModPlug Tracker itself, and in January 2004, he released the entire source code under an open-source license. The ModPlug Player source code is still closed as of May 2020.

=== OpenMPT ===
Lapicque's ModPlug Tracker code was taken up by various tracker musicians/programmers, and is now known as OpenMPT.

OpenMPT is distributed as free software and is, as of October 2026, under active development. Until May 2009 (v1.17.02.53) OpenMPT was licensed under the Copyleft GPL-2.0-or-later and then relicensed under the terms of the permissive BSD-3-Clause. Since OpenMPT 1.23 (March 2014), OpenMPT is also available as a 64-bit application. This allows musicians to use 64-bit VST plugins and make use of the entire physical memory on 64-bit systems. For this purpose, OpenMPT provides its own plugin bridge, which can be used to run plugins with a different bitness than the host in a separate process, or to run plugin in a sandbox and prevent them from crashing the host application.

Also based on the ModPlug code is OpenMPT's "sister project" Schism Tracker (a clone of Impulse Tracker) which contributed several backports of bugfixes to OpenMPT.

== Features ==
OpenMPT's main distinguishing feature is its native Windows user interface. Most trackers, even newer ones such as Renoise, have interfaces modelled after older trackers such as FastTracker II. It supports samples, VST plugins and OPL3 instruments as sound sources. OpenMPT makes use of features common to Microsoft Windows programs, such as context menus for effect selection, "tree" views (for files, samples, and patterns), drag and drop functionality throughout, and the native look and feel of the Windows platform.

It supports both loading and saving of IT (Impulse Tracker), XM (FastTracker Extended Module), MOD (Protracker and similar), S3M (Scream Tracker 3) and MPTM (its own file format) files, imports many more module and sample file formats, and has some support for DLS banks and SoundFonts.

OpenMPT was also one of the first trackers to support opening and editing of multiple tracker modules in parallel. OpenMPT supports up to 128 tracks/channels, VST Plugins, VST instruments and has ASIO support.

=== MPTM file format ===
Due to limitations of the various module formats it is able to save, a new module format called MPTM was created in 2007.

OpenMPT introduced some non-standard additions to the older file formats. For example, one can use stereo samples to XM modules and add VST plugins to XM and IT modules, which were not supported in the original trackers. Many of these features have gradually been removed from IT and XM files and made available only in MPTM files.

=== libopenmpt ===
libopenmpt is a cross-platform module playing library based on the OpenMPT code with interfaces for C, C++ and other programming languages. To ensure that the code bases do not diverge like in the case of ModPlug Tracker and libmodplug, libopenmpt development takes place in the same code repository as OpenMPT. Official input plug-ins for popular audio players (XMPlay, Winamp and foobar2000) based on libopenmpt are also available from the website. FFmpeg also offers an optional module decoder based on libopenmpt. libopenmpt can also serve as a drop-in replacement for libmodplug and thus offer up-to-date module playback capabilities for software that relies on the libmodplug API.

== Reception and users ==
Nicolay of the Grammy-nominated The Foreign Exchange has revealed that ModPlug is his "secret weapon". Movie and video game music composer Raphaël Gesqua told in an interview he uses OpenMPT.

Peter Hajba and Alexander Brandon used OpenMPT to compose the soundtracks for Bejeweled 2, Bejeweled 3 and other PopCap games.

Electronic rock musician Blue Stahli has mentioned that he used ModPlug Tracker and other trackers in the past.

Finnish developer Hempuli used OpenMPT to create the soundtrack of Baba Is You. The project files were released for free online.
