= UFMOD =

uFMOD

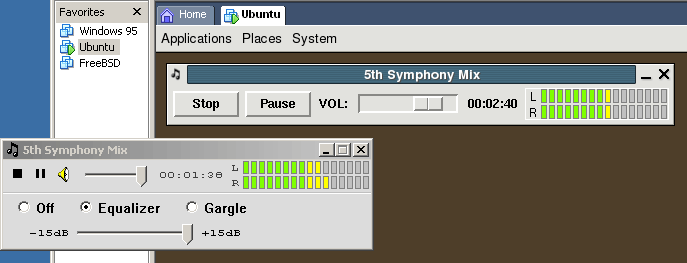
- Original authors: Asterix and Quantum
- Release: 26 January 2006; 20 years ago
- Stable release: 1.25.2a / 12 October 2020; 6 years ago
- Written in: Assembler
- Operating system: Microsoft Windows, Linux, FreeBSD, KolibriOS
- Available in: 3 languages
- List of languages English, Spanish, Russian
- Type: Game middleware Game development tool Digital audio workstation
- License: Freeware
- Website: ufmod.sourceforge.io
- Repository: sourceforge.net/projects/ufmod/files/

uFMOD (or μFMOD) is a freeware audio player library written in x86 assembly language. It is used to load and play audio files in XM format.

In the library name, the lowercase u letter is the micro symbol μ.

The uFMOD source code can be compiled using FASM.

Audio libraries supported
Operating System	Audio Libraries
Microsoft Windows	WinMM, DirectSound, OpenAL
Linux	OSS, ALSA, OpenAL
FreeBSD	OSS
KolibriOS	Infinity Sound Audio Library

The uFMOD library was ported to several programming languages and development environments:

- C#
- Visual Basic
- Dev-C++
- PureBasic
- FreeBASIC
- BlitzMax
- Emergence BASIC
- Delphi
- Free Pascal
- Tcl/Tk

The AOCRYPT cryptographic engine uses uFMOD to ensure a specific executable file size. The patcher dUP2 uses uFMOD to play background music.

== Games using uFMOD ==
Due to its small size, the uFMOD is used in compact video games to play background music, for example:

- Lunar Jetman Remake, a PC remake of the ZX Spectrum original.
- Four-in-a-row, an open source game for Windows and Linux.
- Shooter 2D, an open source shooter implemented for the Independent Games Developers Contests (IGDC).
- Diamond Fighters, a freeware 2D arcade for Linux.
