= OctaMED =

Sound tracker for the Commodore Amiga

- Original author: Teijo Kinnunen et al.
- Developers: RBF Software (Windows, Amiga until 2015); A-EON Technology Ltd (Amiga since 2015)
- Initial release: 1989; 36 years ago
- Stable release: OctaMED SoundStudio 8.1 (Amiga); MED Soundstudio 2.1 (Windows)
- Operating system: AmigaOS, Windows
- Website: www.octamedsoundstudio.com

OctaMED is a music tracker for the Amiga, written by Teijo Kinnunen. The first version, 1.12, was released in 1989 under the name MED, which stands for Music EDitor. In April 1990, version 2.00 was released with MIDI support as the main improvement. In 1991 the first version with the name OctaMED was released, so-called as it could replay eight independent channels on the Amiga's four-channel sound chip. This was also the first commercial version of the software. The publisher had previously been RBF Software of Southampton, UK which was run by Ray Burt-Frost. The current publisher is A-EON Technology Ltd.

== History ==
The distinguishing feature of MED and OctaMED in comparison to other music trackers on the Amiga was that MED and OctaMED had native MIDI support for external instruments via the Amiga's serial port – this allowed many musicians to sequence a combination of outboard studio equipment and internally generated sounds to create studio quality releases such as I Created Disco by Calvin Harris.

OctaMED was chiefly used by musicians to create stand-alone works, rather than by game or demo musicians to make tunes that play in the context of a computer game or demo.

Firstly, this is because the MED and OctaMED music replay routine is simply too slow to be used in a game or demo. Most trackers are optimized for speed of replay code, taking less than 3% of CPU time. MED took roughly 40% of CPU time. Secondly, and this is also one of the reasons why MED draws more CPU power, the MED format allowed a greater degree of complexity in music construction, with arbitrary length of pattern sheets, sections and blocks rather than a simple pattern-list, and a greater number of effects for the sound. This additional complexity was welcomed by music composers, who preferred more sophisticated structure to their compositions and did not see it as a simple list of timed note-presses.

The technique of playing more channels of music than the Amiga hardware was capable of was first introduced with Jochen Hippel's "Hippel 7V" routine, which used code initially developed for the Atari ST to perform software mixing of 4 channels to a single output, played back alongside the remaining three Amiga hardware sound channels. The seven-channel routine then appeared in a tracker called TFMX. Finally, the routine was optimized so it could mix an additional channel, resulting in eight channels of sound. This playback method was suited for instances where a number of samples that don't require fidelity can be played through the software mixed channel, and cleaner samples through the remaining three hardware channels.

OctaMED took a different approach, where two software-mixed channels are played through each of the four hardware audio channels. This brings some limitations, such as paired software channels sharing some effects such as hardware volume control, the higher-quality playback routine requires a more powerful CPU, and some louder samples can sound distorted due to limitations in the mixing process.

OctaMED was developed by Teijo Kinnunen on the Amiga until 1996. His last version, called OctaMED Soundstudio, had features like MIDI file support, ARexx support, support for 16-bit and stereo samples, hard disk recording, and support for up to 64 channels.

Teijo Kinnunen handed over the development of OctaMED to other programmers soon after the final Amiga version was released. The new programmers later released a Windows port, but the lack of features and presence of noticeable bugs meant this edition did not achieve the same level of fame as the Amiga release. More versions of the Windows port were later released. It was subsequently renamed to MED Soundstudio, and has had several releases under that name.

A later approach to extend the features of the Amiga version of OctaMED was performed by Kjetil Matheussen starting in 1997. By hacking the binary he managed to make a more low-level plugin system than was already available via the ARexx language. With the help of NSM (an open source patching and plug-in system for OctaMED) the users could now get access to the CAMD MIDI library, 48-channel MIDI interfaces, signal processing plugins for the sample editor, interaction with the sequencer Bars&Pipes, and many other esoteric features, far extending the features offered for the commercial Windows version of OctaMED.

In February 2015 A-EON Technology Ltd acquired the rights to OctaMED for Amiga and Amiga-like next generation systems from RBF Software.

In January 2024 active development of the Amiga source code was resumed by AmigaKit Ltd on behalf of A-EON Technology Ltd. OctaMED was updated primarily for inclusion in AmigaKit's A600GS computer system. It is also supplied pre-installed on the forthcoming A1200NG computer system. The latest OctaMED 8 for the A600GS and A1200NG adds important features such as AHI driver support, CAMD Midi Library support and MIDI hardware support for the A600GS. Further GUI enhancements are planned.

The official OctaMED Amiga forum was opened for users in May 2024 in advance of the new OctaMED 8 release. Amigastore states on their wiki that "In 2025 it is due to be released as a separate digital download and boxed software for Commodore-Amiga and Amiga compatible system" but this has yet to materialize. OctaMED 8 is still unavailable to be purchased separately and remains as an exclusive to the A600GS and A1200NG. As of 2025, OctaMED 8 will not function on real Amiga computers or emulators without a patch to crack its copy protection that prevents OctaMED 8 from running outside of the A600GS/A1200NG.

Former version is available for Windows and AmigaOS platforms, called MED SoundStudio.

== Notable users ==
- Drum & bass producer and DJ Aphrodite who was also part of Urban Shakedown, used two Amiga 1200's running OctaMED to create a range of his early hits such as "Dub Moods", "Summer Breeze", "King Of The Beats", joint productions with Micky Finn such as "Bad Ass" and the remix of The Jungle Brothers - "True Blue" and also including his first album, Aphrodite.
- UK hardcore/jungle producer Bizzy B was one of the early pioneer producers to use OctaMED, with his Brain Records and Brain Progression labels debuting many early Hardcore and Jungle artists using OctaMED on the Commodore Amiga.
- Mark Salud, who played his OctaMED Modules live on Television performance on Public Access TV.
- Drum & bass producer DJ Zinc used OctaMED to create "Super Sharp Shooter"
- The hardcore techno/jungle producers Urban Shakedown used MED 3.0 running side by side on two separate Amiga 500s to create all of their early tunes including the 1992 British top 40 hit, "Some Justice".
- Christoph de Babalon produced his 1997 album "If You're Into It I'm Out of It", using an Amiga running Octamed, a Yamaha RY-30 drum machine and a DD-3 Boss Digital Delay pedal.
- EC8OR and several other artists signed to Digital Hardcore Recordings or producing early breakcore music from 1994 onwards used Amigas running Octamed.
- Early in his career Venetian Snares used various versions of OctaMED on both the Amiga and PC.
- British drum & bass producer Paradox uses OctaMED in the studio and live on stage.
- The 2009 album Amiga Railroad Adventures by artist Legowelt was produced with OctaMED on an Amiga 1200.
- UK electronica producer Matt Barker, using the artist moniker Epicentre, learnt his trade on the Amiga and made the jump onto OctaMED for his first few tracks in the late 1990s.
- Welsh born group Unleashed produced an album Gasshouse Guerillas almost entirely on the Amiga using OctaMED.
- Calvin Harris used OctaMED to produce the entirety of his first album, I Created Disco. During the Brit Awards 2024, Calvin Harris performed the track Miracle live on stage alongside his Commodore Amiga 1200 running OctaMED
- Rob Haigh, better known as drum & bass producer Omni Trio, used OctaMED to produce his early singles "Mystic Stepper" and "Renegade Snares" as well as most of "Deepest Cut".
- Pete Cannon uses OctaMED in most of his productions.

== See also ==
- List of audio trackers
