= NoiseTracker =

Music tracker for the Amiga

- Original authors: Pex "Mahoney" Tufvesson; Anders "Kaktus" Berkeman
- Initial release: 1989; 37 years ago
- Stable release: 2.0 / April 1990; 36 years ago
- Operating system: AmigaOS
- Platform: Amiga
- Available in: English
- Type: Music tracker

NoiseTracker is a freeware tracker created in 1989 for the Amiga platform. It was based on the Ultimate Soundtracker and developed by Pex "Mahoney" Tufvesson and Anders “Kaktus” Berkeman. It was used by Amiga game musicians to create music with four channels of sampled stereo sound. Additionally it was used by some music groups as a low cost alternative to a full studio for rudimentary backtrack music production. One of the users is Axwell of Swedish House Mafia.

== See also ==
- List of audio trackers
