= ModPlug Player =

Module file player

- Developer: Olivier Lapicque
- Final release: 1.46.02 / September 27, 2002; 23 years ago
- Operating system: Windows (95, 98)
- Successor: OpenMPT
- Type: Module file player
- License: Proprietary
- Website: openmpt.org/legacy_software#modplug-player

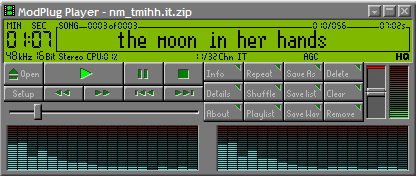
ModPlug Player

ModPlug Player is a module file player developed by Olivier Lapicque in conjunction with the original ModPlug Tracker project and the ModPlug Browser plugin. Features include a playlist editor, graphical equalizer, automatic gain control, bass expansion, reverb, Dolby Surround Sound support and the ability to mix two modules simultaneously and to change their pitch and tempo. The player supports a variety of module music files in both native and compressed (ZIP / RAR / LHA) formats.

The software was originally developed along with ModPlug Tracker, now known as OpenMPT, and modernized ModPlug engine is now used for decoding module files in the open source multimedia framework GStreamer under the name libmodplug.

== See also ==
- List of Amiga music format players
- MOD
- List of music software
