= Music tracker =

Type of software for creating music

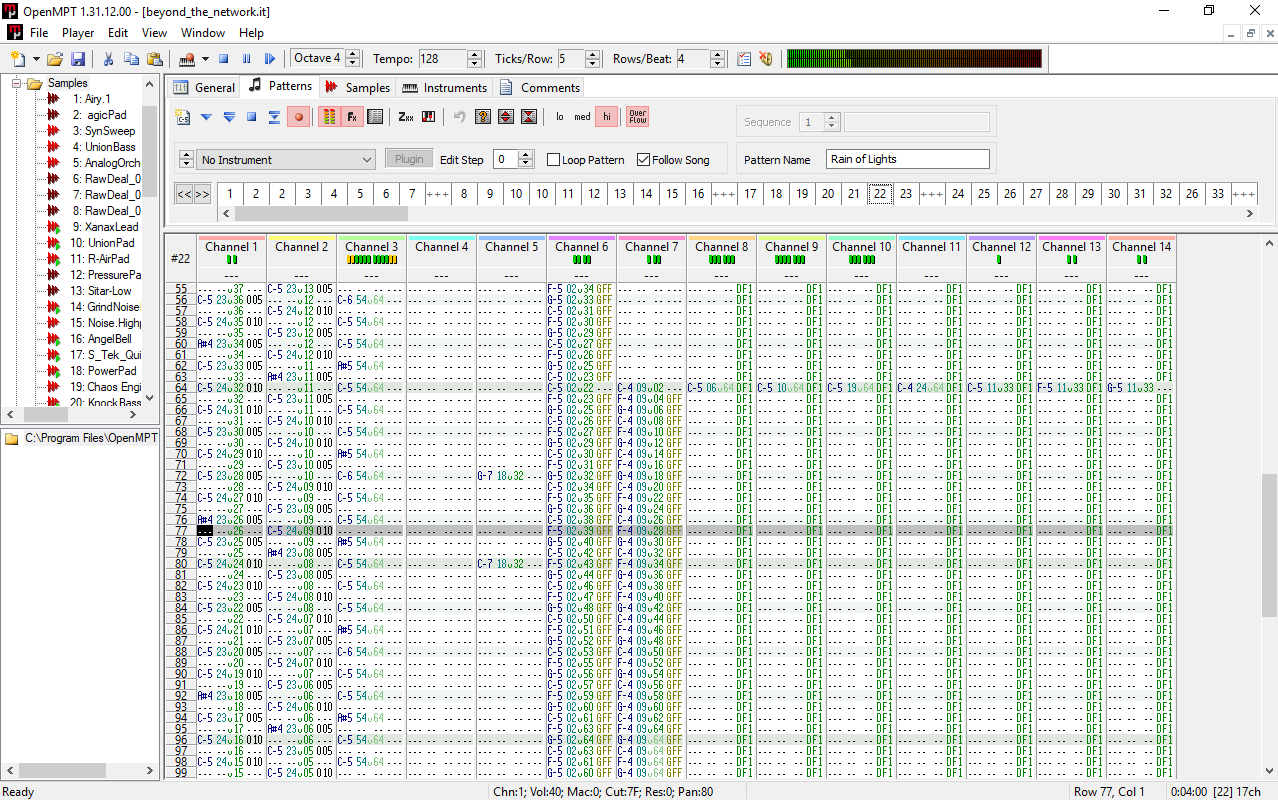
OpenMPT, a tracker running on Windows 10, playing the Bejeweled 2 track "Beyond the Network" by Finnish composer Skaven.

A music tracker, or simply a tracker, is a type of music sequencer. The music is represented as discrete musical notes positioned in several channels at chronological positions on a vertical timeline. A music tracker's user interface is traditionally number based. Notes, parameter changes, effects and other commands are entered with the keyboard into a grid of fixed time slots as codes consisting of letters, numbers and hexadecimal digits. Separate patterns have independent timelines; a complete song consists of a master list of repeated patterns.

Later trackers departed from solely using module files, adding other options both to the sound synthesis (hosting generic synthesizers and effects or MIDI output) and to the sequencing (MIDI input and recording), effectively becoming general purpose sequencers with a different user interface.

In the 2020s, tracker music is still featured in demoscene products for old hardware platforms and demoparties have often separate tracker music competitions. Tracker music may also be used in games which borrow aesthetics from past decades, or games with highly adaptive original soundtrack.

== History ==
=== 1987: Origins on the Amiga ===
The term tracker derives from Ultimate Soundtracker (the first tracker software) written by Karsten Obarski and released in 1987 by EAS Computer Technik for the Amiga. Obarski made the program to help his friend with the production of a soundtrack for a game he was making (Amegas). Obarski was inspired by the vertical layout of SoundMonitor in the creation of his program, but tried to make the interface more simple. He labeled the four channels with the words Melody, Accompany, Bass, and Percussions. Ultimate Soundtracker was a commercial product, but soon shareware clones such as NoiseTracker (1989) appeared as well. The general concept of step-sequencing samples numerically, as used in trackers, is also found in the Fairlight CMI sampling workstation of the early 1980s. Some early tracker-like programs appeared for the MSX (Yamaha CX5M) and Commodore 64, before 1987, such as Chris Huelsbeck's SoundMonitor, but these did not feature sample playback, instead playing notes on the computer's internal synthesizer. Later, programs like Rock Monitor also supported additional sample playback, usually with short drum samples loaded in RAM memory.

The first trackers supported four pitch and volume modulated channels of 8-bit PCM samples, a limitation derived from the Amiga's Paula audio chipset and the commonplace 8SVX format used to store sampled sound. However, since the notes were samples, the limitation was less important than those of synthesizing music chips.

=== 1990s: MS-DOS versions ===
During the 1990s, tracker musicians gravitated to the PC as software production in general switched from the Amiga platform to the PC. Although the IBM and compatibles initially lacked the hardware sound processing capabilities of the Amiga, with the advent of the Sound Blaster line from Creative, PC audio slowly began to approach CD Quality (44.1 kHz/16 bit/Stereo) with the release of the SoundBlaster 16.

Another sound card popular on the PC tracker scene was the Gravis Ultrasound, which continued the hardware mixing tradition, with 32 internal channels and onboard memory for sample storage. For a time, it offered unparalleled sound quality and became the choice of discerning tracker musicians. Understanding that the support of tracker music would benefit sales, Gravis gave away some 6000 GUS cards to participants. Coupled with excellent developer documentation, this gesture quickly prompted the GUS to become an integral component of many tracking programs and software. Inevitably, the balance was largely redressed with the introduction of the Sound Blaster AWE32 and its successors, which also featured on-board RAM and wavetable (or sample table) mixing.

The responsibility for audio mixing passed from hardware to software (the main CPU) which gradually enabled the use of more channels. From the typical 4 MOD channels of the Amiga, the limit had moved to 7 with TFMX players and 8, first with Oktalyzer and later with the vastly more popular OctaMED (Amiga, 1989), then 32 with ScreamTracker 3 (PC, 1994) and 16 with FastTracker 2 (PC, 1994) and on to 64 with Impulse Tracker (PC, 1995) and MED SoundStudio (updated version of OctaMED). An Amiga tracker called Symphonie Pro even supported 256 channels.

As such, hardware mixing did not last. As processors got faster and acquired special multimedia processing abilities (e.g. MMX) and companies began to push Hardware Abstraction Layers, like DirectX, the AWE and GUS range became obsolete. DirectX, WDM and, now more commonly, ASIO, deliver high-quality sampled audio irrespective of hardware brand.

There was also a split off from the sample based trackers taking advantage of the OPL2 and OPL3 chips of the Sound Blaster series. All Sound Tracker was able to combine both the FM synthesis of the OPL chips and the sample based synthesis of the EMU-8000 chips in the Sound Blaster AWE series of cards as well as MIDI output to any additional hardware of choice.

Jeskola Buzz is a modular music studio developed from 1997 to 2000 for Microsoft Windows using a tracker as its sequencer where the sounds were produced by virtual machines (Buzzmachines) such as signal generators, synthesizer emulators, drum computers, samplers, effects and control machines, that where connected in a modular setup. Each machine would have its own tracker, drum machines would use a tracker-like drum pattern editor and effect and control machines could be automated tracker-like via tables of parameters.

=== 2000s: Multiple platforms ===
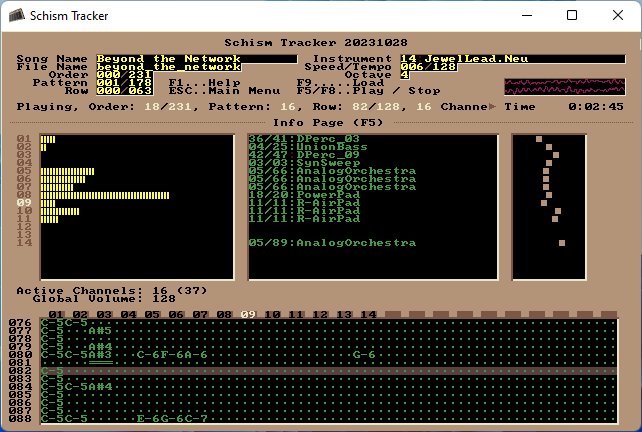
Schism Tracker, a cross-platform clone of Impulse Tracker, running on Windows 11 with a text mode GUI, also playing Skaven's "Beyond the Network".

Tracker music could be found in computer games of the late 1990s and early 2000s, such as the Unreal series, Deus Ex, Crusader: No Remorse, Jazz Jackrabbit and Uplink. Some of the early Amiga trackers such as Protracker (1990) and OctaMED have received various updates, mostly for porting to other platforms. Protracker having resumed development in 2004, with plans for releasing version 5 to Windows and AmigaOS, but only version 4.0 beta 2 for AmigaOS has been released.

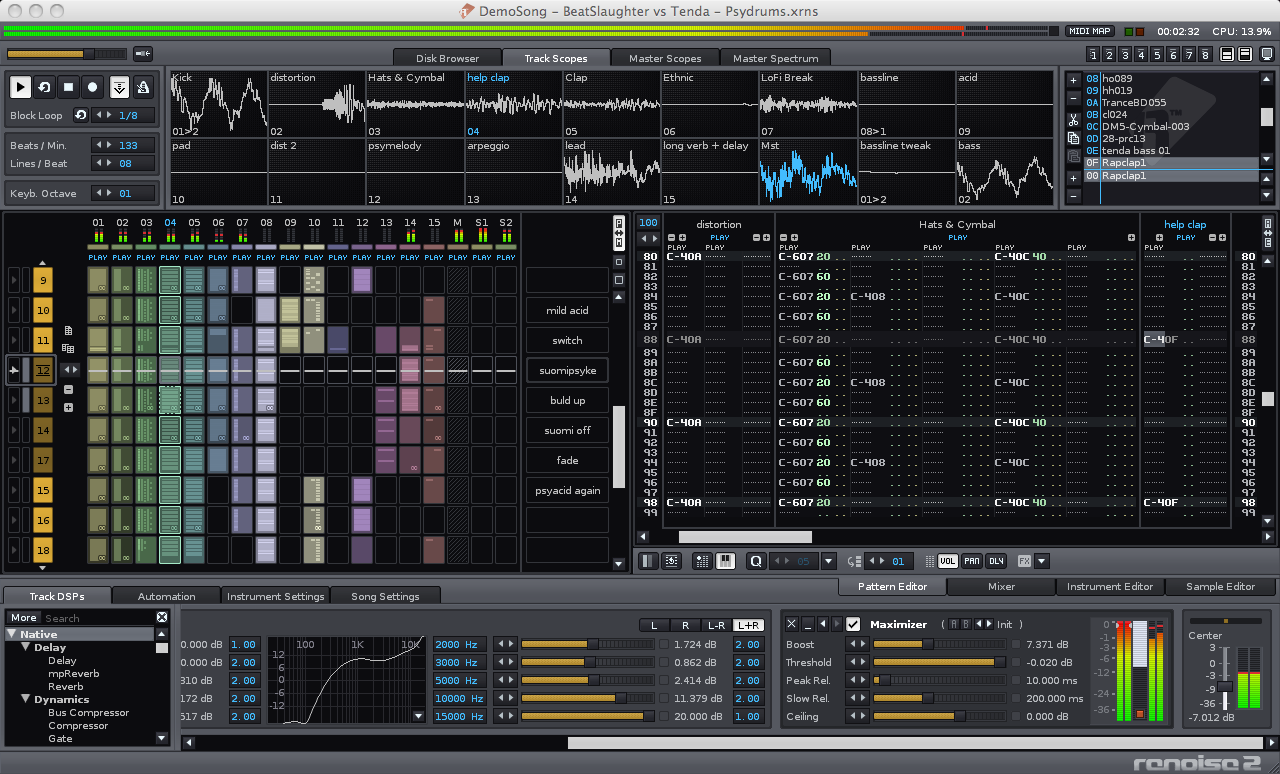
Renoise, a popular tracker in the 2000s and 2010s.

During 2007, Renoise (PC, 2002) and OpenMPT (PC, 1997) were presented in Computer Music Magazine as professional and inexpensive alternative to other music production software.

Modern trackers include, but are not limited to, Deflemask, FamiTracker, VGM Music Maker, Furnace (which currently is the only tracker allowing multiple sound chips from multiple systems to be played simultaneously (for example, Commodore 64 and PC-98 together.)), and SunVox (Music Tracker with modular synth engine and a free form, dynamic length pattern timeline system)

== Hardware ==
The earliest trackers existed to get closer to the hardware of a given machine, allowing memory-light playback of music ideal for games and similar programs. Keeping in theme with this philosophy, a few "hardware trackers" have emerged: specialized hardware designed specifically to host tracker software, in turn designed to exploit the hardware of the machine. These hardware trackers are largely inspired by LittleSoundDJ, a tracker created for the original Game Boy.

The first such hardware tracker released was the NerdSeq in 2018, a hybrid tracker-sequencer for Eurorack systems. As a module of said system, it cannot be used alone, and the "tracker" portion of the device is simply used as an interface to sequence, while the hardware is used to handle sampling and other functions.

The first standalone hardware tracker released was the Polyend Tracker in 2020, a USB-powered device with all the functions of a software tracker. It was met with mostly positive critical reception, with critics citing a modest price point, standalone all-in-one capability, and intuitive controls. In 2021, DirtyWave released the M8 Tracker, a portable tracker that is more heavily inspired by Little Sound DJ.

== Terminology ==
There are several elements common to any tracker program: samples, notes, effects, tracks (or channels), patterns, and orders.

A sample is a small digital sound file of an instrument, voice, or other sound effect. Most trackers allow a part of the sample to be looped, simulating a sustain of a note.

A note designates the frequency at which the sample is played back. By increasing or decreasing the playback speed of a digital sample, the pitch is raised or lowered, simulating instrumental notes (e.g., C, C#, D, etc.).

An effect is a special function applied to a particular note. These effects are then applied during playback through either hardware or software. Common tracker effects include volume, portamento, vibrato, retrigger, and arpeggio.

A track (or channel) is a space where one sample is played back at a time. Whereas the original Amiga trackers only provided four tracks, the hardware limit, modern trackers can mix a virtually unlimited number of channels into one sound stream through software mixing. Tracks have a fixed number of "rows" on which notes and effects can be placed (most trackers lay out tracks in a vertical fashion). Tracks typically contain 64 rows and 16 beats, although the beats, rows and tempo can be increased or decreased to the composer's taste.

A basic drum set could thus be arranged by putting a bass drum at rows 0, 4, 8, 12 etc. of one track and putting some hi hat at rows 2, 6, 10, 14 etc. of a second track. Of course, bass and hats could be interleaved on the same track, if the samples are short enough. If not, the previous sample is usually stopped when the next one begins. Some modern trackers simulate polyphony in a single track by setting the "new note action" of each instrument to cut, continue, fade out, or release, opening new mixing channels as necessary.

A pattern is a group of simultaneously played tracks that represents a full section of the song. A pattern usually represents an even number of measures of music composition.

An order is part of a sequence of patterns that defines the layout of a song. Patterns can be repeated across multiple orders to save tracking time and file space.

There are also some tracker-like programs that utilize tracker-style sequencing schemes, while using real-time sound synthesis instead of samples. Many of these programs are designed for creating music for a particular synthesizer chip such as the OPL chips of the Adlib and SoundBlaster sound cards, or the sound chips of classic home computers.

Tracker music is typically stored in module files where the song data and samples are encapsulated in a single file. Several module file formats are supported by popular audio players. Well-known formats include MOD, MED, S3M, XM and IT. Many of these formats can also be imported into existing trackers, allowing to view arrangement, instrumentation and the use of effect commands. This also makes the self-teaching of music composition using trackers easier and allows to extract instruments for later use in own songs, which was very common.

== See also ==
- Overdubbing – Audio recording technique
- Digital audio workstation – Device or software used for recording, editing and producing audio files
- List of music software
- Computer game music
- Chiptune and tracker musicians
