= XMPlay =

Freeware audio player software

- Original author: Ian Luck
- Developer: Un4seen Developments
- Stable release: 4.1 / December 23, 2025; 10 months ago
- Operating system: Windows 98 or later
- Size: 360 KB
- Available in: English, Russian, others
- Type: Audio player
- License: Freeware Proprietary
- Website: www.un4seen.com

XMPlay is a freeware audio player for Windows. Initially released in 1998, it is often used as a reference player for tracker audio files.

== Overview ==
Developed by Un4seen Developments in 1998, it originally only supported the XM file format of Fast Tracker II, from where the name "XMPlay" originates.

XMPlay is able to handle many tracker file formats, as well as widely used music formats such as MP3, Ogg Vorbis, AAC, Opus, WAV, WMA, as well as many less common formats, through plug-ins found on the website. Plugins from the Winamp audio player can also be used to extend XMPlay's capabilities.

The software offers typical audio player features, such as being able to play internet radio streams, organizing music files into playlists, gapless playback, the visualization of sounds generated by real-time animations, and the ability to change the appearance of the audio player.

== Engine ==
XMPlay's engine for processing audio files is available as a separate program library under the name of BASS or BASSMOD (only for tracker files) or BASSASIO (Steinberg's ASIO protocol). These libraries can also be used on non-Windows operating systems, they are free for non-commercial use, with commercial use needing to pay a fee for a license (with the exception of BASSMOD, which doesn't require a license). For the Unix audio player, "X Multimedia System" (XMMS), a MOD playing plug-in based on BASSMOD is available.

== See also ==
- MO3
