= Renoise =

Digital audio workstation

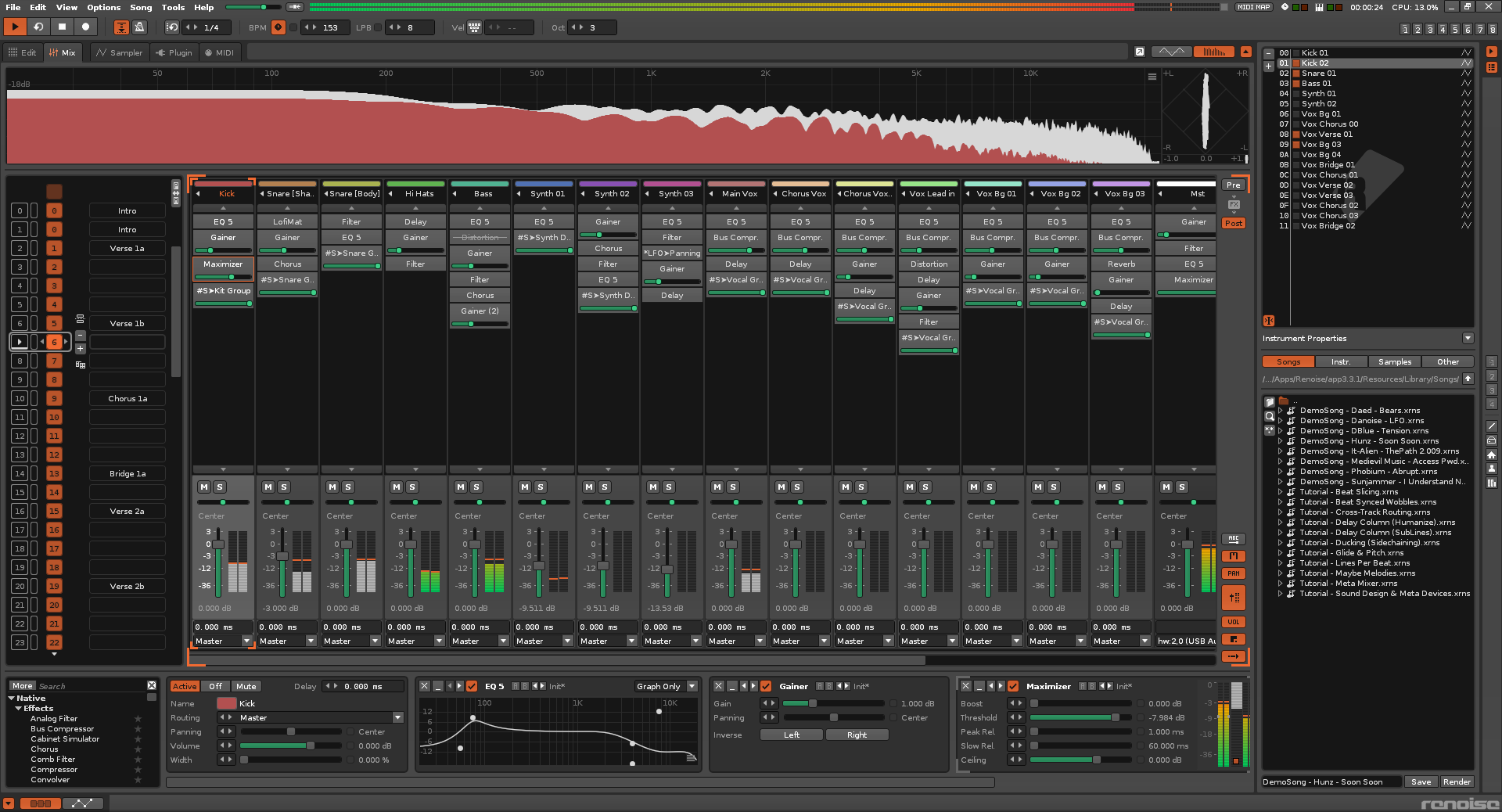
- Renoise 3.3.1 running on Linux
- Original authors: Eduard Müller (Taktik) and Zvonko Tesic (Phazze)
- Developers: Eduard Müller (Taktik), Lucio Asnaghi (kRAkEn/gORe) and Erik Jälevik
- Initial release: June 2002; 23 years ago
- Stable release: 3.5.4 / November 19, 2025; 5 months ago
- Operating system: Windows, macOS, Linux
- Type: Digital audio workstation, Tracker
- License: Proprietary
- Website: www.renoise.com

Renoise is a digital audio workstation (DAW) based upon the heritage and development of tracker software. Its primary use is the composition of music using sound samples, soft synths, and effects plug-ins. It is also able to interface with MIDI and OSC equipment. The main difference between Renoise and other music software is the characteristic vertical timeline sequencer used by tracking software.

== History ==
Renoise was originally based on the code of another tracker called NoiseTrekker, made by Juan Antonio Arguelles Rius (Arguru). The then-unnamed Renoise project was initiated by Eduard Müller (Taktik) and Zvonko Tesic (Phazze) in December 2000. The development team planned to take tracking software into a new standard of quality, enabling tracking scene composers to make audio of the same quality as other existing professional packages, while still keeping the proven interface that originated with Soundtracker in 1987. Version 1.0 was released in June 2002. Over the years the development team has grown to distribute the tasks of testing, administrative, support and web duties among several people.

== Features ==
Renoise currently runs under recent versions of Windows (DirectSound or ASIO), macOS (Core Audio) and Linux (ALSA or JACK). Renoise has full MIDI and MIDI sync support, VST 3 plugin support, ASIO multi I/O cards support, integrated sampler and sample editor, internal real-time DSP effects with unlimited number of effects per track, master and send tracks, full automation of all commands, Hi-Fi wav/aiff rendering (up to 32-bit, 192 kHz), Rewire support, etc.

Supported sample formats

WAV, AIFF, FLAC, Ogg, MP3, CAF

Supported effects standards

VST, AU, LADSPA, DSSI

Renoise also features a Signal Follower and cross-track routing. The Signal Follower analyzes the audio output of a track and automates user-specified parameters based on the values it generates. Cross-track routing sends the automation of any Meta Device to any track. Computer Music magazine considered the combination of these two features to "open up some incredibly powerful control possibilities", and demonstrated how the signal triggered by a drum loop could control the filter cutoff frequency on a bass sound.

Renoise includes an arranging tool called the "pattern matrix", full cross-track modulation routing, built-in effects including a signal-follower metadevice that allows sidechain functionality, automatic softsynth-to-sample instrument rendering, and improved MIDI mapping.

== Versions ==
Renoise is available as either a demo or a commercial version. The demo version excludes rendering to .WAV, ASIO support in Windows (DirectSound only) and a few other features. Also, the demo version has nag screens. The commercial version includes high quality WAV rendering (up to 32 bit 192 kHz) and ASIO support.

== Development ==
With the introduction of Lua scripting in version 2.6, users can expand Renoise. They are encouraged to share their work on the centralized Renoise Tools web page.

=== XRNS file format ===
The XRNS file format is native to Renoise. It is based on the XML standard, and so is readable in any text editor. The XML-based file format makes it possible for anyone to develop 3rd party applications and other systems in order to manipulate file content.

=== Third-party tools ===
A project for creating PHP scripts utilities for needed advanced edit tasks has been set up at SourceForge: XRNS-PHP project.

In August 2007, a functional XRNS2MIDI script was published by Renoise team member Bantai. It enables Renoise users, via an external frontend, to convert native songs into regular MIDI files (.mid) and thus exporting their work for use in conventional piano-roll sequencers such as Cubase or Reason.

Since version 2.6, it is possible to extend Renoise capabilities by writing plugins in the Lua programming language. A specific tools mini site has been created to showcase these. Almost any aspect of the program, except realtime audio data mangling, can be scripted using the native Renoise Lua API.

== See also ==
- List of music software
