= Foobar2000 =

Freeware audio player

foobar2000
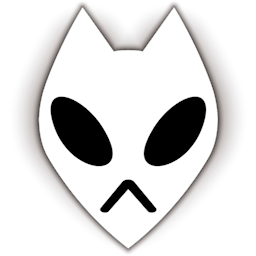

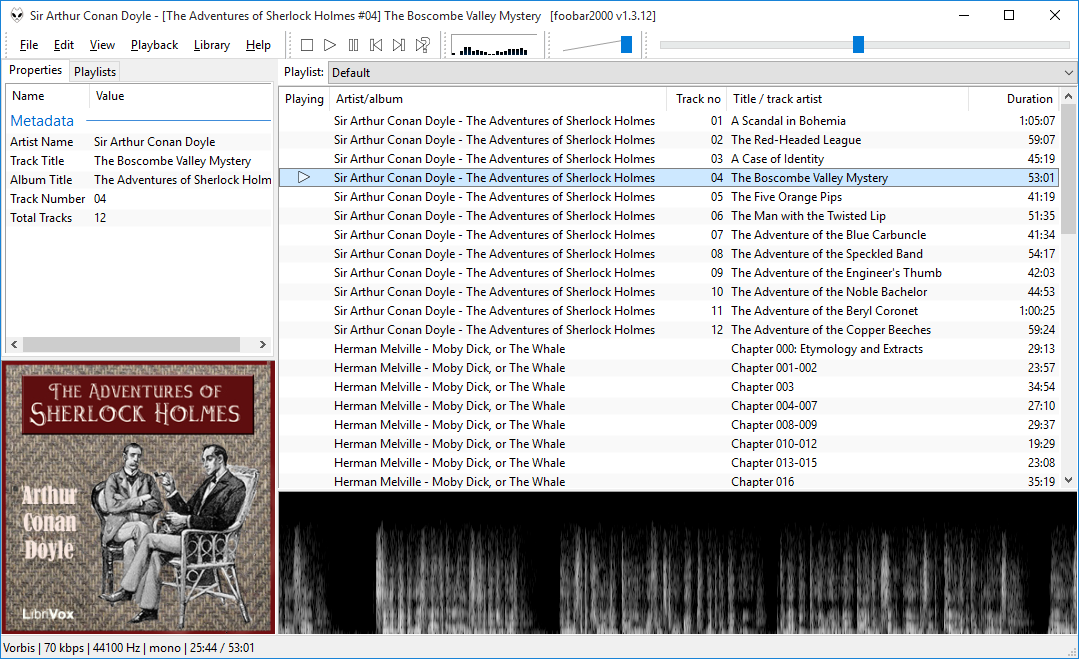
- foobar2000 v1.3.12 on Windows 10
- Developers: Peter Pawłowski and contributors
- Release: 20 December 2002; 23 years ago
- Stable release: 2.26.1 (9 October 2026) [±]
- Preview release: 2.26.2 preview 2026-10-16 (16 October 2026) [±]
- Written in: C++
- Platform: Windows NT, iOS, Android, macOS
- Type: Audio player
- License: Core: Freeware; SDK: BSD (3 clause)
- Website: www.foobar2000.org

foobar2000 (Note: The name foobar is derived from a common placeholder name used in computer programming.) (often abbreviated as fb2k or f2k) is a freeware audio player for Microsoft Windows, iOS, Android, macOS, and formerly Windows Phone, developed by Peter Pawłowski. It has a modular design, which provides user flexibility in configuration and customization. Standard "skin" elements can be individually augmented or replaced with different dials, buttons, and visualizers. foobar2000 offers third-party user interface modifications through a software development kit (SDK).

foobar2000 supports many audio file formats, has many features for organizing metadata, files, and folders, and has a converter interface for use with command line encoders. To maximize audio fidelity in cases where resampling or downscaling in bit depth is required, it provides noise shaping and dithering. There are a number of official and third-party components which add many additional features. The core is closed source, whereas the SDK is licensed under the Three-Clause BSD license.

== History and development ==
foobar2000 was first released on 20 December 2002 and developed by Peter Pawłowski, who had previously worked at Nullsoft and developed plugins for Winamp. He created foobar2000 with the audiophile community in mind. The software's mascot and logo icon consists of a white "alien cat".

foobar2000 supports Windows, though the support of older versions for Windows XP and Vista has been dropped as of version 1.6 (released 2020). Windows 2000 support was dropped as of version 0.9.5 (released 2008) and Windows 95/98/ME/NT4 support was dropped as of version 0.9 (released 2006).

Most functionality also works as intended under Wine on Linux, although the program's crash reporter will detect Wine and direct the user to the Wine Bugzilla. The vast majority of plugins and themes work fine, however, certain plugins may cause issues. Safe mode allows users to disable all plugins temporarily to debug the issue.

foobar2000 versions since 0.9.5 feature a revamped default interface, with embedded support for album list, album art, spectrum visualization, and some other features and improvements.

In May 2016, versions for mobile devices were released, and in January 2018, an early beta version for macOS was released. In April 2023, version 2.0 was released out of beta with native support for 64-bit, dark mode, and ARM.

== Features ==
=== Core ===
At its core, foobar2000 natively supports a range of audio formats, including MP1, MP2, MP3, MPC, AAC, WMA, Ogg Vorbis, FLAC / Ogg FLAC, ALAC, WavPack, WAV, AIFF, AU, SND, Audio CD, Speex, and Opus.

foobar2000 also has a highly customizable user interface, advanced tagging capabilities and support for ripping Audio CDs, as well as transcoding of all supported audio formats using the Converter component. The player can read inside ZIP, GZIP, and RAR archives.

Additional features include ReplayGain support (for both playback and calculation), gapless playback, keyboard shortcuts and support for DSP effects such as equalization and crossfade.

Users can configure the foobar2000 Media Library with automated folder watching and Windows Media streaming. The client is built with an open component architecture, allowing third-party developers to extend functionality of the player.

=== Optional ===
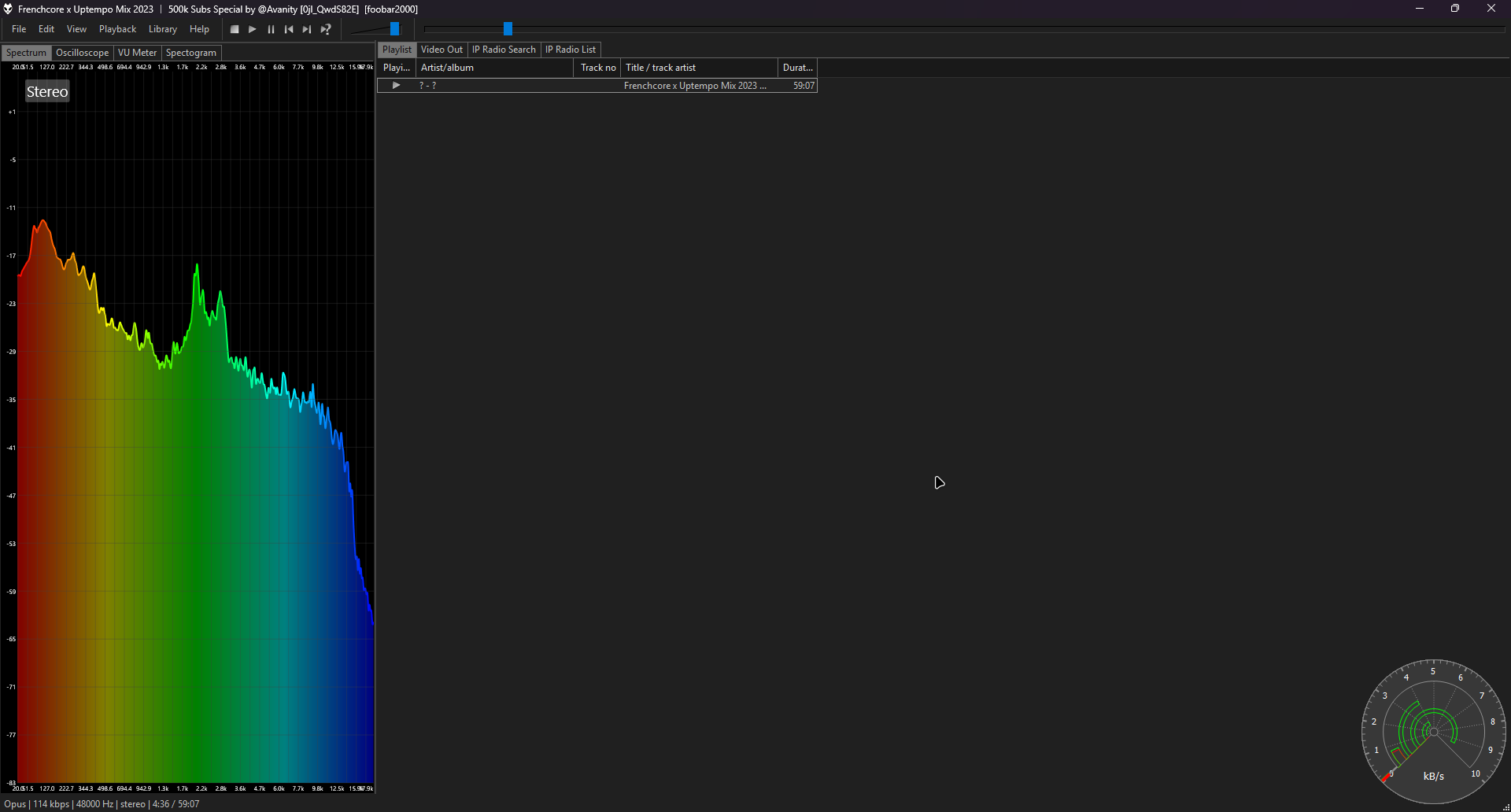
foobar2000 v2.24.2 running on Windows 11 with a third-party spectrum analyzer component installed on it

With addons or plugins, foobar2000 can read the APE, HDCD, AC3, DTS, SACD and DVD-Audio formats.

Other optional features include playback statistics, CD burning, kernel streaming, ASIO support, WASAPI output compatibility, and a UPnP/DLNA renderer, media server and controller for networking. Third-party support is also present in the audio client. For instance, foobar2000 supports Last.fm scrobbling and integration with Apple iPod, including album art support and automatic transcoding of audio formats not supported by iPod itself.

== Derivative works ==
foobar2000 developer Peter Pawłowski has also made other audio software, including Boom, which is aimed at "non-technical people who just want to listen to their music". It comprises a single executable file that runs on Windows without requiring installation.

== See also ==
- Comparison of audio player software
