= Windwalker =

Windwalker may refer to:

- The Wind-Walker, an epithet for Ithaqua, in the Cthulhu mythos stories
- Windwalker (film), a 1981 film starring Trevor Howard and Nick Ramus
- Windwalker (band), a band from Vancouver, British Columbia
- Windwalker (video game), a sequel to the RPG adventure game, Moebius: The Orb of Celestial Harmony, published by Origin Systems
- Windwalker, a 2003 fantasy novel by Elaine Cunningham
- Windwalkers, nickname the former United States Marine Helicopter Training Squadron 301

== See also ==
- Windtalkers, a 2002 American war film
- Windwaker
