= Tangled Tales =

Tangled Tales may refer to:

- Tangled Tales: The Misadventures of a Wizard's Apprentice, a 1989 video game
- Tangled Tales (album), a2009 album by Dan Hicks
