= Times of Lore =

1988 video game

- Developer: Origin Systems
- Publisher: Origin Systems
- Director: Chris Roberts
- Producers: Dallas Snell; Jeff Hillhouse
- Designer: Chris Roberts
- Programmers: Paul C. Isaac; Ken Arnold; Chris Yates
- Artists: Denis Loubet; Douglas Wike
- Writers: Paul C. Isaac; Brian Roberts; Chris Roberts
- Composers: Herman Miller; Martin Galway
- Platforms: Amiga, Amstrad CPC, Apple II, Atari ST, Commodore 64, MS-DOS, NES, ZX Spectrum
- Release: October 1988
- Genre: Action role-playing
- Mode: Single-player

Times of Lore is an action role-playing game developed and published by Origin Systems. It was released in 1988 for Amiga, Atari ST, and Commodore 64, followed by conversions to MS-DOS, ZX Spectrum, Amstrad CPC, Apple II, and the Nintendo Entertainment System.

== Plot ==
The game's story tells of the kingdom of Albareth whose monarch High King Valwyn has disappeared and the dukes and barons are wrestling for power. Barbarians are threatening to invade, while monsters are pillaging the land. The player must assume the role of one of three heroes, picking between a barbarian, a knight, and a valkyrie; and unravel the conspiracy and find three magic items.

== Gameplay ==
Main overhead view in the Commodore 64 version

The game takes place in a world featuring 13,000 screens of map according to promotional material. There is no loading during the game, which was considered a technical accomplishment due to the sheer size of the environment.

The Commodore 64 version features high-res overlays for the sprites, a technique that displays two sprites on top of each other. One is a low resolution multi-colour sprite and the other is a high resolution monochrome sprite. Animated water is also used and the game world slowly changes colour between night and day.

It is possible to end up in unwinnable situations that require restarting the game, such as killing important characters who would otherwise have given certain quests or objects. Killing random peasants is not as dangerous, as staying the night at the inn will make them forget your crimes.

There are many objects that can be found in the game, including a teleportation scroll, healing potions and a returning axe based on Mjolnir. There is the hidden city of Treela, in the middle of the map, behind a forest. Serfs will speak of a dragon in the north, which can be found sleeping in his cave on the eastern edge of the northern mountains. Catacombs also exists, but if entered, the ghouls inside are unleashed upon the world, making the game much more difficult. In the Apple II version, the dragon is replaced with a giant lurking in the northwest portion of the map.

== Development ==
Times of Lore, developed by Chris Roberts, was originally titled Ultra Realm. According to Roberts, it was inspired by console action-adventures, particularly The Legend of Zelda. Roberts stated that "interfaces and design are being affected" by the video game console market and what "the Japanese market originally demanded were certain constraints which did not affect the depth and quality of a game."

== Reception ==
Reception

Review score
Publication	Score
Hippon Super!	4/10 (FC)

Awards
Publication	Award
Crash	Crash Smash
Sinclair User	SU Classic
Your Sinclair	Megagame

Scorpia of Computer Gaming World recommended Times of Lore as an introductory computer RPG, noting the dialogue and actions were menu-driven, simplifying the game. Compute! agreed with the recommendation, noting that the game's scale was smaller than the Ultima games' and praising its graphics and sound. The magazine named the game in its list of "nine great games for 1989" as "an excellent introductory-level fantasy role-playing game".

== Legacy ==
Times of Lore went on to inspire several later games by Origin Systems. This includes the 1990 title Bad Blood, another action RPG based on the same engine. It also inspired the 1990 title Ultima VI: The False Prophet, that adopted several elements from Times of Lore, including real-time aspects, a constant-scale open world (replacing the unscaled overworld of earlier Ultima games), and an icon-based point & click interface. Richard Garriott, in addition to citing it as an influence on Ultima VI, said that Ultima VII: The Black Gate was also inspired by Times of Lore. Some have considered the game as a precursor to Diablo and Baldur's Gate: Dark Alliance.
