= Strike Commander =

1993 video game

- Developer: Origin Systems
- Publisher: Electronic Arts
- Director: Chris Roberts
- Producers: Chris Roberts; Erin D. Roberts
- Designers: Chris Roberts; Jeff George
- Programmer: Jason Templeman
- Artists: Paul Isaac; Chris Roberts
- Writer: Gilbert P. Austin
- Composers: Nenad Vugrinec; Dana Karl Glover
- Platforms: MS-DOS, PC-98, Windows
- Release: April 1993: AU: April 22, 1993
- Genre: Combat flight simulation game
- Mode: Single-player

Strike Commander is a combat flight simulation video game developed by Origin Systems, designed and directed by Chris Roberts, and published by Electronic Arts. It was released for MS-DOS in April 1993. Set in the then-near future of 2011, the game casts the player as the second-in-command of the Wildcats, a private military company specializing in air combat. The player accepts paid missions, uses the proceeds to purchase weapons, and primarily flies an F-16 Fighting Falcon, with the F-22 Raptor becoming available late in the game.

Development lasted more than four years and involved at least one major restart as Origin worked to refine the game's graphics engine. The game was subsequently expanded with a separately sold Speech Pack and Strike Commander: Tactical Operations, which added further missions and flyable aircraft. A later CD-ROM edition combined the original game, the expansion, and additional audio, and the game was re-released for Windows through GOG.com in 2013.

Contemporary reviews emphasized Strike Commander's action-oriented approach rather than high-fidelity flight simulation. Computer Gaming World praised its accessibility and graphics in 1993, while also describing it later that year as probably the most hardware-intensive game yet released. In 1994, PC Gamer UK ranked the CD-ROM version 36th on its list of the 50 best computer games of all time.

== Gameplay ==
The player accepts missions from characters and gets paid for doing them which allows the player to buy more weapons. The missions involve flying an F-16 Fighting Falcon and, in the last missions of the game, the more advanced F-22, while accomplishing certain objectives and missions.

Other simulators, such as the F-22 series from Novalogic have been compared with Strike Commander because of their simplified flight model and emphasis on graphic detail, which makes them relatively similar in terms of philosophy.

== Plot ==
The game takes place in the then-near-future 2011. The end of the Cold War and the Gulf War have triggered a massive rise in global instability, compounded by natural disasters and failed economic policy in the United States. Capitalizing on the growing need for security, the Turkish government allows private security contractors to operate with near-complete freedom from Istanbul provided they register with the Ministry of Foreign Affairs for a regular fee.

The protagonist is the second-in-command of the Wildcats, a private security company specializing in air combat led by James Stern; the player is referred to as "Commander" by in game characters. Although the Wildcats are a veteran squadron, the company has struggled to keep pilots on its roster as of late, owing primarily to Stern's strict policy against civilian casualties. The Wildcats' biggest rival is the Jackals, led by Stern's former second-in-command Jean-Paul Prideaux.

== History ==
=== Development ===
The Strike Commander project took more than four years and over a million man-hours on background development. Very little of that production time turned out to be actually usable in the final product, as at least one and possibly several complete project "reboots" were required to refine the graphical engine to a playable state. Nevertheless, some successful gameplay elements from Strike Commander were re-used by other more notable Origin products such as the Wing Commander series. Chris Roberts, in the game's manual, compares the game's long development time with the events in the 1991 documentary Hearts of Darkness: A Filmmaker's Apocalypse, a film account of what it took to get the 1979 film Apocalypse Now made.

=== Release ===
The game was included as part of a 1994 Creative Labs bundle pack with Syndicate Plus, Ultima VIII: Pagan and Wing Commander II: Vengeance of the Kilrathi. It was also available in a CD bundle with Wing Commander: Privateer; both games included the core game, the expansion pack and voice pack on a single CD-ROM disc.

A separate Speech Pack, sold on floppy disk, replaced some of the game's text-dialogue with voice-acted recordings. An expansion pack Strike Commander: Tactical Operations continued the game's story by adding more missions and flyable aircraft. A later CD-ROM edition of Strike Commander bundled the game, expansion pack, and more audio content (beyond what was available in the Speech Pack).

In March 2013, Strike Commander was re-released for Windows in the Digital Distribution by gog.com. Also in 2013, a reverse engineering project by Fabien Sanglard with a reconstructed source code variant became available on GitHub as the original source code was most probably lost in the take over of Origin by EA.

== Reception ==
James Trunzo reviewed Strike Commander in White Wolf #37 (July/Aug., 1993) and stated that "Zoom across oceans and watch waves ripple as you streak by. Fly over snow-capped mountains and travel to detailed cities complete with skyscrapers and factories. Take out drug cartels, strafe battlefields and escort diplomats as you try to survive in a war-torn world of the near future. Strike Commander took years to arrive on the scene, but with upcoming add-ons, you'll be playing it for a lot longer than that!"

In August 1993, Computer Gaming World wrote that "Strike is not and does not attempt to be a high-fidelity simulation ... It focuses on action and combat" and "is designed to get players in the air and having fun in the shortest amount of time", with a "much gentler learning curve" than Falcon 3.0 or Red Baron and better graphics than F-117 Stealth Fighter 2.0 or Jetfighter. In December the magazine described the game as "probably the most hardware-intensive game yet released". In April 1994 the magazine said that the CD version's additional difficulty levels, improvement to the "admittedly enhanced combat sequences" including a more realistic F-16 flight model, and the expansion missions made it "the best option".

In 1994, PC Gamer UK named Strike Commander's CD-ROM release the 36th best computer game of all time. In 1996, Computer Gaming World ranked Strike Commander as the 13th top vaporware title in computer game history (due 1991, delivered 1993).

== See also ==
- Pacific Strike
- Wings of Glory
