= Social media use in the 2019–2020 Hong Kong protests =

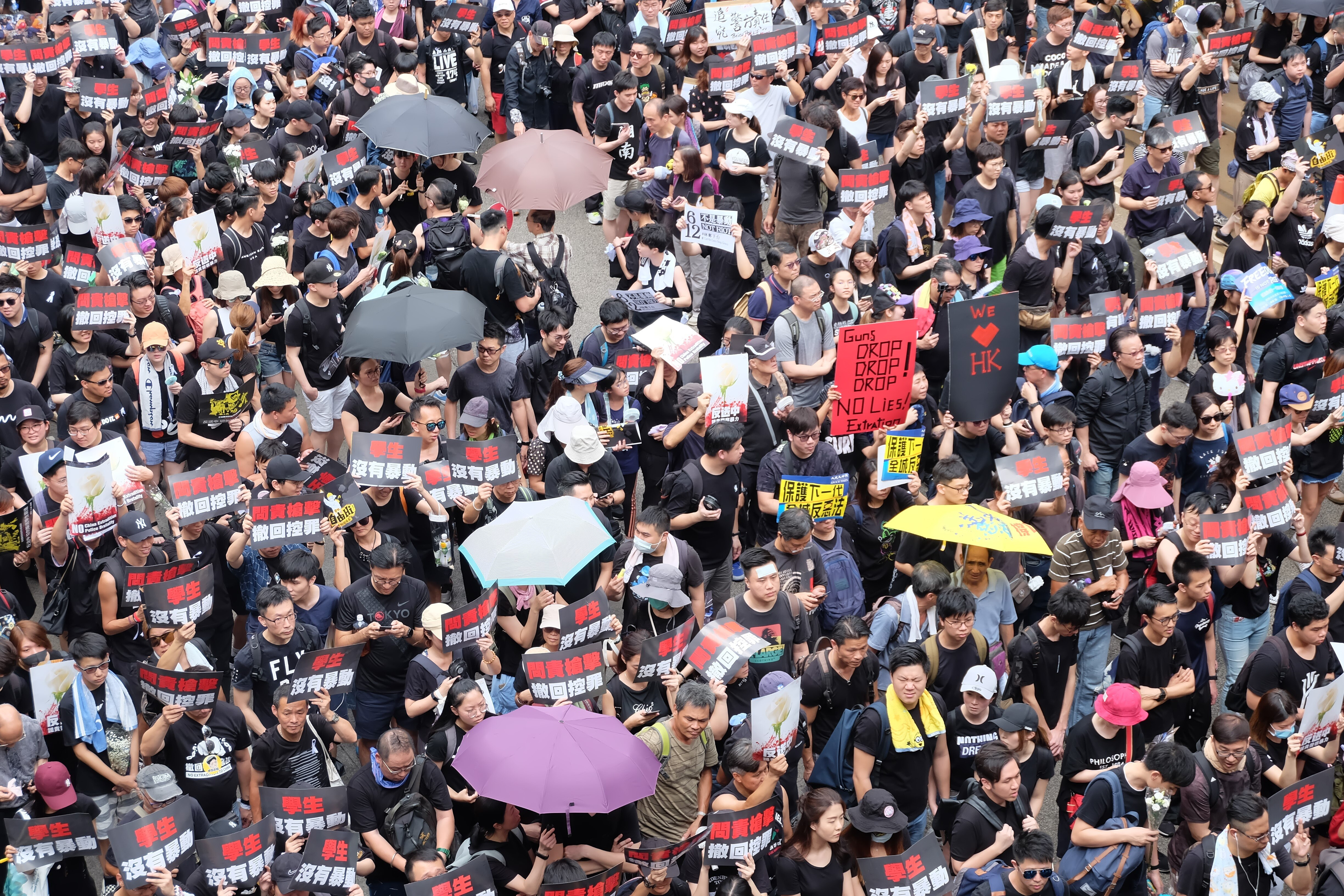
2019 Hong Kong Protest

The 2019–2020 Hong Kong protests happened as a result of the Anti-Extradition Law Amendment Bill. Some observed that it is an extension to the 2014 Umbrella Movement, and there are other underlying issues that amounted to such explosive protest, which cover the economic, social and environmental aspects. With the Chinese Government's attempt in turning Hong Kong to a semi-authoritarian regime, it sparked Hong Kong people's dissent as the Chinese Government's intervention would threaten the Rule of Law in Hong Kong. Thus, people in Hong Kong shown their resistance through protesting, and planning through the use of social media have facilitated the social movements.

A variety of social media platforms were first used in 2014 when the Umbrella Movement took place. The platforms were once utilised again in the 2019–2020 Hong Kong protests by local protestors, as well as domestic and international spectators. Different online applications have been used for the organization and mobilization of protesters, censorship of information, international recognition and solidarity, and as a platform for global responses.

The Hong Kong Protests are considered as 'no centralised platform' and people support the protests by self-joining. Social Media has been called and used as a battleground for public opinion on the Hong Kong Protests because the costs of communications are lowered and they provide space for counterpublic communication. Examples of these social media platforms include Facebook, and Twitter.

It is prevalent for users of these platforms to communicate in "Kongish", the language of Romanised Cantonese and English, which is understood only by Hong Kong people and further the identity of being a HongKonger. Sometimes, online humour is used on social media platforms to express users' dissent towards the Hong Kong government, for example, it is shown through memes. Also, social media users may combine the element of art with social media and create graphics in transmitting protest information.

These social media platforms allows users to stay anonymous, and allows sustainable mobilisation of information and discussions, it is why the protests could continue even without a centralised organisation. It is suggested that the usage of social media has been intensified by the several factors, such as disinformation and misinformation, anonymity, and public support given to students from parties outside Hong Kong. It is especially because of anonymity, social psychology explains that people tend to utilise social media in planning the protests and vandalism, which is why political engagements are happening at an increasing rate with the use of social media. All in all, social media has been used to shape protests attitudes and solidify relationships. The connections between people arises when a controversial issue arises. However, it is also observed that opinions on social media may lead to polarisation in attitudes before and after the protests.

Since most traditional media have been co-opted by the Hong Kong and Chinese Government, it has become increasingly important for the new social media platforms to appear in the media landscape in sharing unfiltered real-time information to the protestors. While social media platforms contribute to the planning and networking of the protests, it is inevitable that public nature of social media platforms, such as Twitter and Facebook made users more suspectable and vulnerable to state surveillance. Thus, users of such platforms have evacuated to safer, encrypted platforms for continuing discussions.

Academics have noted that the Anti-ELAB protest is similar to other movements globally, such as the Arab Spring uprisings, the Spanish Indignados movement, and Turkey's Gezi Park protests because of a flat organisational structure.

== Hong Kong ==
=== YouTube ===
YouTube is banned in mainland China, but is extremely useful for people in Hong Kong to spread news and information on YouTube channels. It offers a safe platform for people to express their disapproval through video and media footages.

In September 2019, the actor Wong Hei created and posted a series of videos onto his personal YouTube Channel called "Baton", which is meant to reveal some of the HKPF's fault in alleged police misbehaviours. The series of videos have received hundreds and thousands of views, which subsequently led to Wong's participation in another series of production by RTHK in February 2020, namely "Headliner". These videos produced by RTHK were later suspended by the Commerce and Economic Development Bureau as it was said to have 'insulted' the police.

=== Telegram ===
Telegram is a cloud-based software that allows users to send encrypted messages that cloak the user's identity. It was used by Hong Kong protest organizers to discuss protest logistics in large group chats. The app hosts thousands of protests in hundreds of group chats to discuss updates regarding times and locations of protests to building access codes allowing protests to hide from tear gas. Previously, the app allowed individuals to match user pseudonyms to entries in their contact list, but Telegram disabled this feature, allowing users to remain anonymous from Chinese and Hong Kong government officials.

For example, the "HK Confirmed Sight-ings Channel" offers users the platform to share sightings of Police officers and their locations, providing protestors real-time information so that protestors can immediately change their locations and tactics in confronting the Police Officers. Similarly, "Dad Finds Boy" is another channel which offers a platform for doxxing police information, which has been banned from further usage due to personal privacy reasons after thousands of family pictures, phone numbers and personal addressed have been leaked publicly.

Telegram grew 323% year-over-year in July 2019 in Hong Kong, adding 110,000 new users as opposed to 26,000 in July 2018.

=== WhatsApp/Signal ===
Similar to Telegram, WhatsApp and Signal are both used as a platform for protestors to exchange information on where and when they will be protesting. It also provided information of first aid stations and requests for supplies for front liners' use.

=== Airdrop ===
AirDrop is another medium through which protesters have communicated logistical plans. Users go into large crowded public areas and airdrop information to anyone who has their receiving settings enabled. Airdrop has also been a way through which information has been distributed to mainland China. The messages are written in simplified Chinese (Hong Kong uses traditional characters) which hints that the intended audience of the messages are mainlanders. In some cases, protesters would provide a QR code advertised as a method of payment. Scanning the image, however, would then trigger the airdrop of the desired information onto their device.

=== LIHKG ===
LIHKG, a Chinese language Reddit-like online forum website has been developed as a backbone of the protests and has been used for transmitting schedules and sharing strategies with other forum users. It is noted that LIHKG is an efficient online tool in facilitating the protests because users can use the voting system and it would automatically move popular threads up with which allow more users to view the post. This platform also shows a democratic approach because the users could state their preference in what they want to read. The ability to unify people and apparent as this forum is public and it facilitated the leadership and feedback of protestors. Its quality of being momentary and real-time influenced 'collective intelligence' in preparing for the protests.

== Mainland China ==
=== Weibo ===
Weibo, known as "China's Twitter," has most users from mainland China. It is a public community for Chinese citizens, where they have a relatively large amount of freedom of speech, but are still restricted to use some predefined "sensitive words." Any post which contains these "sensitive words" will be automatically deleted by Weibo officials; moreover, sometimes the account would be banned entirely.

During the Hong Kong protest, Weibo, just like Twitter, had its own hashtag where people gathered together to express their opinions. The most popular hashtag was called "Hong Kong Riot" instead of "Hong Kong Protest" or "StandWithHongKong", which are common hashtags in Hong Kong and internationally. Other trending hashtags include "Protect Hong Kong" and "Officers, We Support You". Another trending topic was Officer Liu, a police officer who was beaten during one of the protests on 31 July. Images of him, photos of the incident, posts by the Chinese state media, and his own Weibo posts have gone viral. Content in support of the Hong Kong police became very popular during this time.

Although Weibo is the most famous social media platform where people can interact with others, the Chinese government still plays a very important role in this community. Unlike the official accounts for governments on Twitter, the government-controlled Weibo accounts, such as the Communist Youth League or People's Daily, are actually playing a role that is a combination of law enforcement and direct speaker for policy makers. Thus, most of the information on Weibo about the 2019 Hong Kong Protests will not be representative of the views of the protesters, as the channel for speaking the perspective is prohibited. Similar to survivor bias, the posts that remain on the discussion page are preselected.

=== WeChat ===
WeChat known as the international version of Weixin is where users are distinguished from each other through mobile numbers used in registration for either WeChat or Weixin accounts. Because Hong Kong is under the Weixin server, users in Hong Kong who have a Hong Kong phone number would be registered under the Weixin server. Weixin users are those who have registered using mainland China's mobile phone numbers, while other users are categorized in WeChat servers. Because WeChat's servers are outside of China and are not subject to Chinese law, while Weixin servers are in China and are subject to Chinese law, each individual's data is stored in different locations. As Hong Kong is under the Weixin server, the Hong Kong protests are more censored in mainland China. According to the WeChat privacy guidelines, collecting sensitive information from users is meant to meet relevant laws and regulations of the identity verification network system requirements in China. Therefore, all users within Hong Kong and mainland China must be registered that matches the laws and identity verification to access Weixin and those who do not have a Hong Kong number will then be registered under WeChat.

Mainland China's Reaction to the usage of Weixin in Hong Kong protest

During the 2019 Hong Kong protest, the mainland China government announced that WeChat would be heavily monitored because instant messaging services were being used to spread violence and terrorism. According to the Central Government of the People's Republic of China reacting to the Hong Kong protest, the Central Government states:

The vice-chairman of the National Committee of the Chinese People's Political Consultative Conference issued four consecutive posts on social networking sites to strongly condemn [the supporters of the Hong Kong Protest]. The post pointed out, "These scums will be severely published by the law and spurned by history". He called: "The national emblem is smeared. I invite everyone to go online...

The statements passed by the Central Government were widely spread on social media including Weixin, which activated the state's sovereignty in punishing those who support the Hong Kong protests. For example, on 15 September 2019 the Guangzhou police detained Lai Rifu on suspicion of 'picking quarrels.' Lai Rifu had shared a song composed during the protest called "Glory to Hong Kong" which has become the unofficial anthem of the pro-democracy movement on his WeChat account. As well an Hangzhou-based democracy activist Mao Qingxiang was also detained for seven days for his WeChat posts about Hong Kong. There were also comments about Hong Kong avoided controversial issues and focused on cheerleading the government's achievements. Meanwhile, mainland Chinese citizens have planned their "anti-protest" protest on WeChat during the 2019 Hong Kong protest when the Central Government states that:

Every citizen who loves Hong Kong must stand up to support the special administrative region (SAR) government and the police in deafening the rule of law... restore a harmonious and stable social order, and make the "one country, two systems" stable and far-reaching.

Protesters who are pro-government view western social media as biased against users sympathetic to China, as a growing number of them have embraced WeChat where they believe they will be treated more fairly.

Impact of WeChat and Weixin towards Hong Kong protest

WeChat remains a powerful tool for activists throughout the 2019 Hong Kong protest. During the protest, mainland Chinese citizens who stayed in Hong Kong after graduating from a university in Hong Kong joined several protests and posted photos of them on WeChat. At the same time, protesters use the phrase "Let's Go Hong Kong" as a symbol of fighting for Hong Kong's democracy. Although on WeChat, the phrase "Let's Go Hong Kong!" did not yield any result related to the protest. However, social media such as Weibo do have the phrase 'Let's Go Hong Kong' for cheerleading the Central Government to resolve the violence occurring in Hong Kong instead of symbolizing Hong Kong's democracy. Furthermore, WeChat also contains articles suggesting how the extradition bill is not a good solution to the legal case such as where a Hong Kong man killed a woman in Taiwan but fled to his home city. These articles negatively criticized the decisions made by the Central Government from mainland China, the article was later removed by a large-scale Chinese censorship operation a few hours after it was published on WeChat.

In addition, some Hong Kong protesters distraught by the violent turn of events created digital apologies on WeChat but the posters were immediately censored by deleting and blocking such information on the WeChat platform. Meanwhile, when people tried to post photos of people holding candles and singing on WeChat 'moments', WeChat would show a message stating the WeChat account has been suspected of spreading malicious rumours and has been temporarily blocked. To unblock a user's WeChat account from spreading malicious rumours, WeChat users are required to record faceprint for security purposes to unblock a WeChat account. This showcased how WeChat and Weixin are both censored by mainland China as users can be easily detained if they were to post information such as the Hong Kong protest.

== International ==
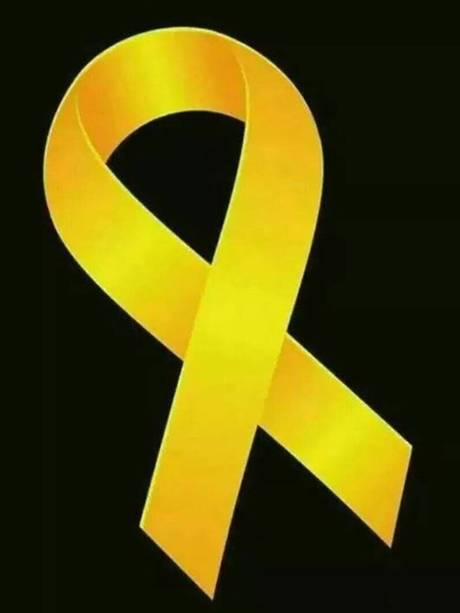
The Yellow Ribbon image has been used on Facebook users profile since 2014, which is a symbol of support for the Hong Kong Protests.

=== Facebook ===
In the summer of 2019, Facebook users all around the world were changing their Facebook profile photos using an overlay of a bloodstained Bauhinia flower. This profile picture change was a way to show support for Hong Kong protesters. The posts were often accompanied by hashtags or captions showing support for Hong Kong. In addition to the Bauhinia flower pictures, netizens have been expressing their personal opinions on Facebook posts throughout the Hong Kong political activities.

Data has revealed that Facebook is an effective social media platform to dissipate information and keep the protests running because Facebook's "Friend" and "Unfriend" functions would maintain the online network once they are built. Even when a controversy has ended, users would not deliberately "unfriend" their connections.

=== Twitter ===
It is discovered that Twitter has already been in use since 2014, when the Umbrella Movement first started. In the 2019–2020 Hong Kong Protests, Twitter is still used to spread instant news. Users post videos and photos to Twitter in real time, they like, retweet, comment, use hashtags and tag major journalists and publications in their tweets. Studies show that Twitter is used more commonly among foreign correspondents. Their twitters feeds report directly of their on-the-ground experiences of the protests. Foreign correspondents would also connect with other local journalists more actively than people outside of their professional, with the intention for people to influence users to share information with other users rather than inviting people to contribute to the context of the post, which also explains why connecting various threads makes it easier for users to find information within a certain context, i.e. Hong Kong Protests. Foreign correspondents are not only observers but advocates for the Hong Kong Protests because they may have similar developed negative emotions towards the Hong Kong and Chinese government during the Anti-ELAB protests. As such they are usually more sympathetic of protestors and this would strengthen the journalist-audience relationship and encourage solidarity. On the other hand, the Chinese government have tried to censor information and retaliate but launching disinformation campaign to dilute the information that has been posted on Twitter by foreign correspondents.

One example is the Yuen Long attacks on the evening of 21 July. Gwyneth Ho posted a video on the @StandNewsHKTwitter account of the attacks at the Yuen Long MTR station. The viral video shows herself and other people being hit by men wearing white shirts. It is common for videos and live streams such as these to be posted during major protest activities.

On 4 October 2019, general manager of the Houston Rockets, Daryl Morey, tweeted the logo to "Fight for Freedom Stand with Hong Kong". CCTV, Tencent and the Chinese Basketball Association responded by halting deals with the NBA or banning NBA on the media. Chinese companies withdrew their sponsorships of the NBA, leading to losses of supposedly $25 million US dollars. There was also an onset of Chinese social media accounts with negative responses to Morey's tweet.

The NBA responded to the tweet on Sina Weibo with an apology letter in response to China's backlash. This apology led to backlash from US basketball fans, and many users posted with #StandWithMorey and #StandWithHongKong. Netizens have criticized the NBA for being driven by business intentions to issue the apology to China, one of the NBA's largest markets. Political and celebrity figures such as Ted Cruz, Hillary Clinton and Tilman Fertitta have weighed in on the situation on social media. This event has been credited for drawing major international attention to the Hong Kong protests. The original tweet has been deleted.

Soon after on 8 October 2019, famous video game competitor Blitzchung made waves when he appeared on the Hearthstone championship livestream and said "Liberate Hong Kong. Revolution of our times" while wearing a mask. This happened soon after Carrie Lam announced the face mask ban. Blizzard revoked his prize money and banned him from competing for a year, to which other video game players and fans responded online with #BlizzardBoycott and #BoycottBlizzard. 64% of the #BoycottBlizzard tweets were from the US. The international video game community showed solidarity through social media posts, reddit threads, and an online petition called "Gamers for Freedom". Blitzchung's actions and the ensuing social media response added impetus to the movement by pushing more international supporters to become vocal online.

== Online confrontations ==
=== Doxing and cyberbullying ===
Doxing and cyberbullying were tactics used by both supporters and opponents of the protests. Some protesters used these tactics on police officers and their families and uploaded their personal information online. By early July 2019, an estimated 1,000 officers' personal details had been reportedly leaked online, and nine individuals had been arrested. Affected officers, their friends and families were subject to death threats and intimidation. By early June 2020, the number of officers doxed on social media was estimated at 1,752. HK Leaks, an anonymous website based in Russia, and promoted by groups linked to the CCP, doxed about 200 people seen as being supportive of the protests. An Apple Daily reporter who was doxed by the website was targeted with sexual harassment via "hundreds of threatening calls". University student leaders also received death threats. Protest leaders have been attacked after being doxed. No arrests have been made for doxing protesters.

On 25 October 2019, Hong Kong Police obtained a court injunction prohibiting anyone from sharing any personal information about police officers or their families. The ban was criticised for the possibility of producing a chilling effect on free speech and having an excessively broad scope. Cheng Lai-king, the chairwoman of the Central and Western District Council, was arrested for sedition after she shared a Facebook post which contains the personal information of a policeman who allegedly blinded the eye of an Indonesian journalist. The arrest was controversial as the law was established during the colonial era and was rarely used.

=== Spread of misinformation and propaganda ===
Both sides of the protests spread unverified rumours, misinformation and disinformation, which caused heightened reactions and polarisation among the public. This included tactics such as using selective cuts of news footage and creating false narratives. Following the Prince Edward station incident, pro-democracy protesters laid down white flowers outside the station's exit to mourn the "deceased" for weeks after rumours circulated on the internet alleging that the police had beaten people to death during the operation. The police, fire service, hospital authority and the government all denied the accusation. Several deaths, most notably, that of Chan Yin-lam, a 15-year-old girl whom the police suspected had committed suicide, were the subject of a conspiracy theory given the unusual circumstances surrounding her death. Rumours that female protesters were offering "free sex" to their male counterparts were repeated by a senior government member. Another rumour was that the CIA was involved in instigating the protests after photographs of Caucasian men taking part in the protests were shared online. The pro-Beijing camp also claimed pro-democracy lawmaker Lam Cheuk-ting was responsible for bringing protesters to Yuen Long causing the attack to occur, despite the fact that Lam himself was a victim of the attack and arrived after the attack began. The police blamed fake news for causing public's distrust towards law enforcement, though the police itself were also accused by several media outlets and prosecutors of lying to the public.

On 19 August 2019, both Twitter and Facebook announced that they had discovered what they described as large-scale disinformation campaigns operating on their social networks. Facebook found posts which included images that were altered or taken out of context, often with captions intended to vilify and discredit the protesters.

According to investigations by Facebook, Twitter, and YouTube, some attacks were coordinated, state-backed operations that were believed to have been carried out by agents of the Chinese government. A report by the ASPI found that the purported disinformation campaign promoted three main narratives: condemnation of the protesters, support for the Hong Kong Police, and "conspiracy theories about Western involvement in the protests." Google, Facebook, and Twitter banned these accounts. In a Facebook post, the Hong Kong edition of state-run China Daily suggested the protesters would launch a terrorist attack on 11 September 2019, producing as sole evidence a screenshot which it claimed to be from a group chat message on Telegram.

=== Cyberattacks ===
On 13 June 2019, allegations of organised cyberattacks were made against the Chinese government. Pavel Durov, the founder of Telegram, suggested that the Chinese government may be behind the DDoS attacks on Telegram. On Twitter, Durov called the attack a "state actor-sized DDoS" because the attacks were mainly from IP addresses located in China. Additionally, Durov further tweeted that some of the DDoS attacks coincided with the protest on 12 June 2019. Anonymous LIHKG moderators also suggested that the DDoS attack they experienced on 31 August 2019 were "unprecedented" and that they have "reasons to believe that there is a power, or even a national level power behind... such attacks." The forum identified two Chinese websites as being among those involved in the attack, including Baidu Tieba.
