= Ken Demarest =

Computer game programmer

Kenneth Llewellyn Demarest III is a computer game programmer, artist, and business person.

== Career ==
Demarest worked on Wing Commander and developed 3D, texture-mapped characters for BioForge. As Director of Technology at Origin Systems, Demarest developed the technical prototype for Ultima Online using Ultima VI as its code base. His later work resulted in the persistent-world real-time strategy game NetStorm: Islands At War, which, as of March 2016 , was being re-made in 3D as Disciples of the Storm, funded through KickStarter.

In social gaming, Demarest was part of the early work blending 3D multiplayer online games and social game play both stand-alone and on networks such as Facebook and MySpace.

Demarest was a founder of Appsoma, a platform as a service for scientific analysis.

As an artist for Shadow Garden he wrote 'Sand', the most popular and frequently sold work on the platform developed by Zack Simpson. Sand is in the permanent collections of numerous museums worldwide including the Discovery Science Center and the Sony Wonder Technology Lab. Demarest's later work supported technology that benefits humanity, including MorSand, a 2006 Tech Award Laureate, and CellBazaar, a 2007 Laureate.

Demarest was appointed director of product development for Twitch's developer success team in a new office in Austin, Texas.
