= Windwaker =

Windwaker may refer to:

- The Legend of Zelda: The Wind Waker, a 2002 video game
- Windwaker (band), an Australian metalcore band

== See also ==
- Windwalker
