= Chris Roberts (video game developer) =

American game designer and filmmaker (born 1968)

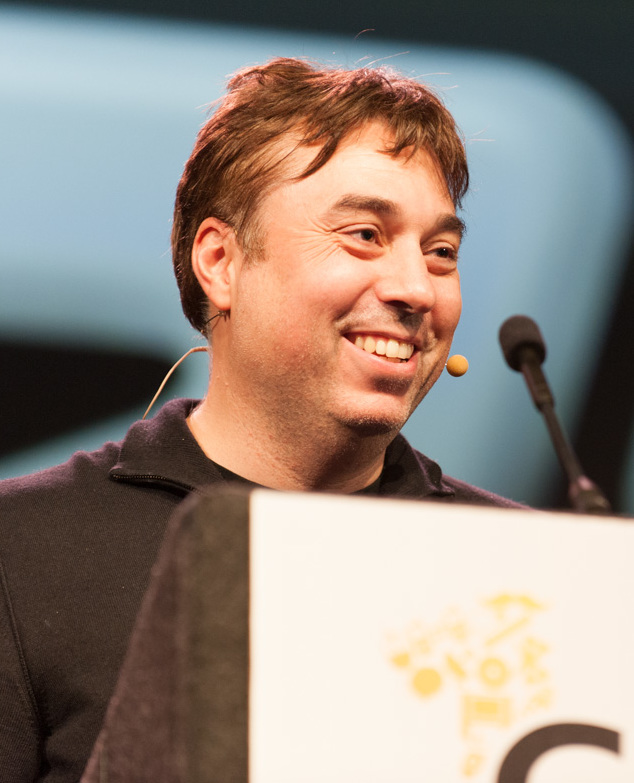
- Chris Roberts at GDC Online 2012
- Born: May 27, 1968 (age 58); Redwood City, California, U.S.
- Occupations: Business executive, game designer, filmmaker
- Years active: 1987–present
- Known for: Wing Commander; Freelancer; Star Citizen
- Title: Founder & CEO of Cloud Imperium Games
- Spouse: Sandi Roberts (m. 2009)
- Partner: Madison Peterson (–2005)
- Children: 2

Chris Roberts (born May 27, 1968) is a British-American video game designer, programmer, film producer and film director. He created the Wing Commander series while at Origin Systems and has been working on the crowdfunded space simulator Star Citizen since 2010.

== Early life ==
Roberts was born in Redwood City, California to a British father and an American mother, and grew up in Manchester, England. He attended Parrs Wood High School, the same school as computer music composer Martin Galway. As a teenager, he created several video games for the BBC Micro, including Stryker's Run, Wizadore, and King Kong.

== Career ==
=== Origin ===
Roberts returned to the United States in 1986 to visit his parents, who had settled in Austin, Texas. Chris Roberts joined Origin Systems in 1987. There he created Times of Lore which was published in 1988. The game's interface had a strong influence on other Origin products such as the popular Ultima series. A similar game system was used in Roberts's next release for Origin, Bad Blood (1990).

Wing Commander was published later in 1990 and was highly acclaimed. Wing Commander (and the franchise it spawned) soon became Origin's most successful product. Roberts wasn't as heavily involved in the sequel Wing Commander II, which he only produced. He instead concentrated on Strike Commander. First shown to the public at Summer CES 1991, the project suffered from numerous delays and was not released until 1993. He returned to Wing Commander soon after, devising the original concept for the spin-off Wing Commander: Privateer (which his brother, Erin Roberts, produced) and being more deeply involved in Wing Commander III and Wing Commander IV. For these sequels, Roberts directed the live-action cinematic scenes. Roberts's major role in developing the Wing Commander games led Next Generation to name him one of their "75 Most Important People in the Games Industry of 1995".

Following the traditions of Origin Systems, Chris Roberts's residence at the outskirts of Austin, Texas was named "Commander's Ranch", a reference to the Wing Commander series.

=== Digital Anvil ===
Roberts left Origin in 1996 and founded Digital Anvil with Tony Zurovec and his brother Erin Roberts. He cited disillusionment with working with large development teams and Origin parent company Electronic Arts' unwillingness to give substantial funding to games that weren't sequels. The fledgling studio set up shop in Austin and for several years worked quietly, inking a publishing deal with Microsoft in 1997.

Roberts had stated that he desired to produce films as well as games with Digital Anvil. The 1999 feature film release of Wing Commander directed by Roberts himself, starring Freddie Prinze Jr. and featuring visual effects from Digital Anvil, failed to attract either critical praise or financial success.

Digital Anvil's first finished game was Starlancer, released to a generally favorable critical reception in 2000. Developed jointly between Warthog and Digital Anvil, the game was produced by the Roberts brothers, and Eric Peterson. The company was acquired by Microsoft soon after, who sold two of Digital Anvil's projects, Conquest: Frontier Wars led by Eric Peterson, and Loose Cannon led by Tony Zurovec to Ubisoft. Roberts left the company after the acquisition, abandoning the director position of his ambitious project Freelancer, although he remained with the game in a consulting role for a while. The game was commonly regarded as vaporware due to its promised release date of 2001; however, it was eventually released in 2003 with a markedly different feature set than the initial plans.

=== Point of No Return Entertainment/Ascendant Pictures ===
After leaving Digital Anvil, Roberts founded Point of No Return Entertainment, planning to produce films, television and games. However, no projects materialized from Point of No Return. Roberts founded Ascendant Pictures in 2002 and served as a producer for a number of Hollywood productions including Edison, Timber Falls, Outlander, Who's Your Caddy?, The Big White, Ask the Dust, Lucky Number Slevin and Lord of War, which were almost entirely financed by a loophole in the German tax laws that was finally closed in 2006. Roberts' activities as a film producer ended with the depletion of the funds raised by this controversial financing scheme. In 2005, actor Kevin Costner sued Ascendant Pictures for breach of contract on an unreleased film. The company was acquired by Bigfoot Entertainment in 2010.

=== Cloud Imperium Games ===
In 2011, Chris Roberts founded Cloud Imperium Games with his wife Sandi Roberts, as well as business partner and long-time international media attorney Ortwin Freyermuth. In October 2012, Cloud Imperium Games launched a crowdfunding campaign on their website to develop a space simulation game, Star Citizen, and later added a Kickstarter campaign in conjunction. By November 2012, they had earned US$6,238,563, surpassing all stretch goals set for the campaigns, and breaking video game industry crowdfunding records. Chris Roberts had stated that if at least $23 million could be raised over the course of the crowdfunding campaign, no outside investors' or developers' funding would be required. This goal was reached October 18, 2013.

As of 25 May 2026, Cloud Imperium Games has raised over US$1 billion in funding. Cloud Imperium Games' other title in development, Squadron 42, a single-player campaign set in the Star Citizen universe, is still in development with an estimated release date of 2027, having allegedly been feature-complete and in the polish phase since 2023.

== Personal life ==
Roberts had a long on-and-off relationship with his common-law wife Madison Peterson. Roberts and Peterson had a home in San Diego. He has 1 daughter with Peterson. The first marriage of Chris Roberts with actress Sandi Gardiner (born 24 May 1980 in Adelaide, Australia) was annulled in 2005. He remarried Gardiner in 2009. Roberts sold his Hollywood house in 2007. Afterward he was unsure whether he'd stay in Los Angeles so he rented homes for 10 years. In September 2018 he purchased a house for $4.7 million via the Roberts Family Trust in the Pacific Palisades neighborhood of Los Angeles. He also has a daughter Skye Roberts with Gardiner. Skye is an actress who was born in Santa Monica.

== Works ==
Video games

Name	Year	Credited With	Publisher
King Kong	1983	designer	BBC Micro User
Match Day	1985	designer (BBC Micro port)	Ocean Software
Wizadore	1985	designer	Imagine Software
Stryker's Run	1986	designer, programmer, artist	Superior Software
Ultima V: Warriors of Destiny	1988	designer	Origin Systems
Times of Lore	1988	director, designer, writer, programmer, tester	Origin Systems
Bad Blood	1990	director, designer, programmer	Origin Systems
Wing Commander	1990	director, lead designer, producer, programmer	Origin Systems
Wing Commander: The Secret Missions	1990	producer, programmer	Origin Systems
Wing Commander: The Secret Missions 2: Crusade	1991	producer, programmer	Origin Systems
Wing Commander II: Vengeance of the Kilrathi	1991	producer	Origin Systems
Wing Commander II: Vengeance of the Kilrathi: Special Operations 1	1991	creative director	Origin Systems
Wing Commander II: Vengeance of the Kilrathi: Special Operations 2	1992	creative director	Origin Systems
Strike Commander	1993	director, producer, artist, programmer	Origin Systems
Strike Commander: Tactical Operations	1993	producer	Origin Systems
Wing Commander: Privateer	1993	executive producer	Origin Systems
Wing Commander: Armada	1994	producer	Origin Systems
Wing Commander III: Heart of the Tiger	1994	director, producer, writer, actor	Origin Systems
Wing Commander IV: The Price of Freedom	1996	director, executive producer	Electronic Arts
Starlancer	2000	executive producer	Microsoft
Conquest: Frontier Wars	2001	producer, writer	Ubisoft
Freelancer	2003	original concept	Microsoft Game Studios
Star Citizen	TBA (Note: Playable elements of Star Citizen were first released in 2013, but the game remains in early access, with no final release date announced.)	director	Cloud Imperium Games
Squadron 42	2027	director	Cloud Imperium Games

Films

Name	Year	Credited With	Distributor
Wing Commander	1999	director, actor	20th Century Fox
The Punisher	2004	executive producer	Lions Gate Entertainment
The Jacket	2005	executive producer	Warner Independent Pictures
The Big White	2005	producer	Momentum Pictures
Lord of War	2005	producer	Lionsgate Films
Ask the Dust	2006	executive producer	Paramount Classics
Lucky Number Slevin	2006	producer	Metro-Goldwyn-Mayer
Who's Your Caddy?	2007	executive producer	The Weinstein Company
Outlander	2008	producer	The Weinstein Company
Black Water Transit	2009	executive producer	Capitol Films
