= Origin Systems =

Video game developer based in Austin, Texas

Origin Systems, Inc.
- "We Create Worlds"; Company logo during its final years
- Type: Subsidiary
- Industry: Video games
- Founded: March 4, 1983; 43 years ago in Houston, Texas, U.S.
- Founders: Richard Garriott; Robert Garriott; Owen Garriott
- Defunct: February 2004; 22 years ago
- Fate: Acquired by Electronic Arts, and dissolved
- Successor: Destination Games
- Headquarters: Austin, Texas, U.S.
- Products: Ultima series Wing Commander series Crusader series Strike Commander; System Shock; Wings of Glory
- Parent: Electronic Arts (1992–2004)
- Website: www.origin.ea.com at the Wayback Machine (archived March 30, 1997)

Origin Systems, Inc. was an American video game developer based in Austin, Texas. It was founded on March 3, 1983, by Richard Garriott, his brother Robert and their father Owen. Origin is best known for the Ultima and Wing Commander series. The company was purchased by Electronic Arts in 1992.

== History ==
Brothers Richard and Robert Garriott, their astronaut-engineer father Owen, and programmer Chuck Bueche founded Origin Systems in 1983 because of the trouble they had collecting money owed to Richard for his games released by other companies. Origin was initially based in the Garriotts' garage in Houston, Texas. The company's first game was Ultima III: Exodus; because of Ultima's established reputation and the fact that the company's games were released on computers and not consoles, Origin survived the video-game crash of 1983 which affected console game developers in North America. It published many non-Ultima games, and Richard Garriott claimed that he received the same royalty rate as other developers.

By 1988, Origin had 15 developers in Austin, Texas, and another 35 employees in New Hampshire. By 1989 it had 50 employees between its New Hampshire and Texas offices. By 1992, Origin Systems had sold more than 1.5 million software units worldwide.

In September 1992, Electronic Arts acquired the company for $35 million in stock, despite a dispute between the two companies over EA's 1987 game Deathlord. Origin, with about $13 million in annual revenue, stated that it had considered an IPO before agreeing to the deal.

By 1996, Origin had expanded to more than 300 employees, most of whom were divided among small, largely autonomous development teams. In 1997, Origin released one of the earliest graphical MMORPGs, Ultima Online. After this title, Electronic Arts decided that Origin would become an online-only company after the completion of Ultima IX: Ascension in 1999. However, within a year's time, in part due to Ultima IX's poor reception, EA canceled all of Origin's new development projects, including Ultima Online 2, Privateer Online, and Harry Potter Online. Richard Garriott left Origin shortly after and founded Destination Games in 2000.

In later years, Origin mainly existed to support and expand Ultima Online and to develop further online games based on the Ultima franchise such as Ultima X: Odyssey, originally to be released in 2004 but later canceled. In February 2004, the studio was disbanded by Electronic Arts. The Longbow series of simulation games was developed at Origin and published under the Jane's Combat Simulations brand of Electronic Arts. A follow-on project, Jane's A-10, was under development when the project was canceled in late 1998 and the team moved to other projects.

== Notable employees ==
The 1980s version of the Origin Systems logo

The 1990s version of the Origin Systems logo

Origin employed many young game developers over its tenure who have since gone on to leading roles in numerous game development companies, especially in Austin.

Among its prominent employees were (alphabetically by surname):

- Raymond Benson – Writer, Audio (1992–1993)
  - Was head writer on Ultima VII: The Black Gate, contributed some writing to Ultima VII Part Two: Serpent Isle, and went on to work as a game designer for MicroProse and Viacom New Media, then later became an official continuation author of the James Bond novels.
- J. Allen Brack – QA Tester (1994–2000)
  - Went on to work for Sony Online Entertainment and Blizzard Entertainment and co-founded his own development studio Magic Soup Games.
- Tom Chilton – Lead Designer (2001–2003)
  - Was lead designer on Ultima Online: Age of Shadows and went on to be a lead designer for Blizzard Entertainment.
- Britt Daniel – Sound Designer (1994)
  - Was a sound designer for numerous titles and went on to found the rock band Spoon.
- Ken Demarest – Game Designer, Programmer (1990–1995)
  - Created the technical prototype for Ultima Online, directed BioForge, led programming on Ultima VII: The Black Gate and coded on Wing Commander.
- Martin Galway – Sound Designer/Composer, Audio Technician (1991–1994)
  - Went on to work at Digital Anvil.
- Richard Garriott – Co-Founder, Game Designer, Programmer (1983–2000)
  - Aka "Lord British", creator of Ultima; later co-founded Destination Games, acquired by NCSoft. Co-founded and worked at the now defunct Portalarium.
- Robert Garriott – Co-Founder, Business (1983–2000)
  - Brother of Richard Garriott, co-founded Origin Systems and Destination Games.
- Jeff Hillhouse – Facilities (1983–2004)
  - One of the company's first employees who helped grow its early supply chain and facilities operations.
- Raph Koster – Lead Designer (1995–2003)
  - Later joined Sony Online Entertainment in Austin developing EverQuest II and Star Wars Galaxies.
- Scott Kreuser – Supported the entire software roadmap
  - Went on to work for Dell Computer as a Worldwide New Product Project Manager.
- Starr Long – QA Lead, Designer (1992–2000)
  - Director of Ultima Online, and co-founder of Destination Games.
- Denis Loubet – Artist (1989–2002)
  - Was the first artist Origin hired. He did many box cover paintings, manual illustrations, in-game art and animation, and cinematics.
- Mike McShaffry – Lead Developer (1990–1997)
  - Later co-founded the other Austin studios and has written and taught on game development theory.
- Sheri Graner Ray – Writer, Designer (1993–1994)
  - Went on to work with several major companies including Sony Online Entertainment and Cartoon Network. Also founder of Women in Games International.
- Chris Roberts – Game Designer, Creative Director (1988–1996)
  - Creator of the Wing Commander series and Strike Commander. Co-founded the now-defunct Digital Anvil, acquired by Microsoft, creating Starlancer and contributing to Freelancer space simulator games. Went on to produce a number of Hollywood productions, before co-founding and now working at Cloud Imperium Games, creating the crowdfunded space simulator Star Citizen.
- John Romero – Programmer (1987–1988)
  - Worked at Origin before co-founding id Software. Later co-founded Ion Storm and a number of other game studios. Co-founded and now works at Romero Games.
- Andrew Sega – Music Composer (1995–1998)
  - Aka Necros; was a Software Engineer/Composer who went on to work for Digital Anvil.
- Dallas Snell – Vice President of Product Development / Executive Producer (1985–1996)
  - Head of Product Development, Producer or Executive Producer of Origin's titles between 1986 and 1995. Later served as Director of Business Development for NCSoft North America. Co-founded Portalarium and served as Director of Development and Chief Operating Officer.
- Warren Spector – Producer (1989–1996)
  - Producer of Ultima Underworld: The Stygian Abyss which was developed by Doug Church and Looking Glass Studios, as well as its sequel, System Shock, Wings of Glory and numerous other titles. He later joined Ion Storm and managed its Austin office, creating Deus Ex. Later co-founded the now-defunct Junction Point Studios, acquired by Disney Interactive. Now works at OtherSide Entertainment as its Studio Director, creating System Shock 3.
- Paul Steed – Artist (1991–1995)
  - Was a leading artist on the Wing Commander series and went on to serve as an art lead for id Software on the Quake series.

== List of games ==
Year	Title	Platform(s)
1983	Caverns of Callisto	Apple II
1983	Caverns of Callisto	Atari 8-bit
1983	Ultima III: Exodus	Apple II
1983	Ultima III: Exodus	Atari 8-bit
1983	Ultima III: Exodus	Commodore 64
1985	Ultima III: Exodus	MS-DOS
1985	Ultima III: Exodus	Mac
1985	Moebius: The Orb of Celestial Harmony	Apple II
1985	Ultima IV: Quest of the Avatar	Apple II
1985	Ultima IV: Quest of the Avatar	Commodore 64
1986	AutoDuel	Apple II
1986	Ultima III: Exodus	Amiga
1986	Ultima III: Exodus	Atari ST
1986	Moebius: The Orb of Celestial Harmony	Commodore 64
1986	Ogre	Apple II
1986	Ogre	Commodore 64
1986	Ring Quest	Apple II
1986	Ultima I: The First Age of Darkness	Apple II
1986	Ultima I: The First Age of Darkness	Commodore 64
1986	Ultima I: The First Age of Darkness	MS-DOS
1987	Ultima IV: Quest of the Avatar	Atari ST
1987	Ultima IV: Quest of the Avatar	MS-DOS
1988	2400 A.D.	Apple II
1988	2400 A.D.	MS-DOS
1988	Times of Lore	Apple II
1988	Times of Lore	Commodore 64
1988	Ultima IV: Quest of the Avatar	Amiga
1988	Ultima V: Warriors of Destiny	Apple II
1989	Knights of Legend	Apple II
1989	Knights of Legend	Commodore 64
1989	Omega	Apple II
1989	Omega	Commodore 64
1989	Omega	Mac
1989	Space Rogue	Apple II
1989	Space Rogue	Commodore 64
1989	Tangled Tales: The Misadventures of a Wizard's Apprentice	Apple II
1989	Tangled Tales: The Misadventures of a Wizard's Apprentice	Commodore 64
1989	Tangled Tales: The Misadventures of a Wizard's Apprentice	MS-DOS
1989	Times of Lore	MS-DOS
1989	Ultima V: Warriors of Destiny	Commodore 64
1989	Ultima V: Warriors of Destiny	Commodore 128
1989	Ultima V: Warriors of Destiny	MS-DOS
1989	Ultima V: Warriors of Destiny	Amiga
1989	Windwalker	Apple II
1989	Windwalker	Commodore 64
1990	Bad Blood	MS-DOS
1990	Knights of Legend	MS-DOS
1990	Ultima IV: Quest of the Avatar	Master System
1990	Ultima VI: The False Prophet	MS-DOS
1990	Ultima VI: The False Prophet	Commodore 64
1990	Windwalker	Apple IIGS
1990	Windwalker	Atari ST
1990	Windwalker	Mac
1990	Wing Commander	MS-DOS
1990	Wing Commander: The Secret Missions	MS-DOS
1990	Worlds of Ultima: The Savage Empire	MS-DOS
1991	Bad Blood	Commodore 64
1991	Times of Lore	NES
1991	Ultima: Worlds of Adventure 2: Martian Dreams	MS-DOS
1991	Wing Commander II: Vengeance of the Kilrathi	MS-DOS
1991	Wing Commander II: Vengeance of the Kilrathi - Speech Accessory Pack	MS-DOS
1991	Wing Commander II: Vengeance of the Kilrathi - Special Operations 1	MS-DOS
1991	Wing Commander: The Secret Missions 2 - Crusade	MS-DOS
1991	Ultima: Runes of Virtue	Game Boy
1992	Ultima VII: Forge of Virtue	MS-DOS
1992	Ultima VII: The Black Gate	MS-DOS
1992	Ultima VI: The False Prophet	Amiga
1992	Ultima Underworld: The Stygian Abyss	MS-DOS
1992	Wing Commander	Amiga
1992	Wing Commander II: Vengeance of the Kilrathi - Special Operations 2	MS-DOS
1993	ShadowCaster	MS-DOS
1993	Strike Commander	MS-DOS
1993	Ultima V: Warriors of Destiny	NES
1993	Ultima VII Part Two: Serpent Isle	MS-DOS
1993	Ultima VII: Part Two - The Silver Seed	MS-DOS
1993	Ultima Underworld II: Labyrinth of Worlds	MS-DOS
1993	Wing Commander Academy	MS-DOS
1993	Wing Commander: Privateer	MS-DOS
1993	Wing Commander: Privateer - Speech Pack	MS-DOS
1993	Ultima: Runes of Virtue II	Game Boy
1994	Metal Morph	SNES
1994	Pacific Strike	MS-DOS
1994	Pagan: Ultima VIII	MS-DOS
1994	Pagan: Ultima VIII - Speech Pack	MS-DOS
1994	Privateer: Righteous Fire	MS-DOS
1994	Super Wing Commander	3DO
1994	System Shock	MS-DOS
1994	Ultima: Runes of Virtue II	SNES
1994	Ultima: The Black Gate	SNES
1994	Wing Commander	Sega CD
1994	Wing Commander: Armada	MS-DOS
1994	Wing Commander III: Heart of the Tiger	MS-DOS
1995	BioForge	MS-DOS
1995	Crusader: No Remorse	MS-DOS
1995	CyberMage: Darklight Awakening	MS-DOS
1995	System Shock	Mac
1995	Wing Commander III: Heart of the Tiger	3DO
1995	Wings of Glory	MS-DOS
1996	Abuse	MS-DOS
1996	Crusader: No Regret	MS-DOS
1996	Crusader: No Remorse	PlayStation
1996	Crusader: No Remorse	Sega Saturn
1996	Jane's AH-64D Longbow	MS-DOS
1996	Transland	MS-DOS
1996	Wing Commander III: Heart of the Tiger	PlayStation
1996	Wing Commander IV: The Price of Freedom	MS-DOS
1997	Jane's Combat Simulations: Longbow 2	Windows
1997	Ultima Online	Windows
1997	Wing Commander IV: The Price of Freedom	PlayStation
1997	Wing Commander: Prophecy	Windows
1998	Ultima Online: The Second Age	Windows
1998	Wing Commander: Secret Ops	Windows
1999	Ultima IX: Ascension	Windows
2000	Ultima Online: Renaissance	Windows
2001	Ultima Online: Third Dawn	Windows
2002	Ultima Online: Lord Blackthorn's Revenge	Windows
2003	Ultima Online: Age of Shadows	Windows
2004	Ultima Online: Samurai Empire	Windows

=== Canceled ===
- BioPlus (Add-on for BioForge. Aka. BioForge Plus.)
- Carl's Crazy Carnival
- Citadel (first-person shooter)
- Death & Destruction
- Space Race (racing game in vein of Road Rash and Super Monaco GP)
- Crusader: No Survivors (cancelled multiplayer expansion for Crusader: No Regret)
- Crusader 3: No Escape / Crusader: No Mercy / Crusader II
- Worlds of Ultima: Arthurian Legends
- Ultima Worlds Online: Origin
- Harry Potter Online
- Jane's A-10
- Privateer 3
- Strike Team
- Wing Commander VII
- Ultima X: Odyssey (2004)
