= Mei (Overwatch) =

Fictional character in the 2016 video game Overwatch

Mei-Ling Zhou
- Overwatch character
- Mei and Snowball from Overwatch
- First game: Overwatch (2016)
- Created by: Justin Thavirat
- Designed by: Arnold Tsang; Ben Zhang (equipment); David Gibson (animation)
- Voiced by: Yu "Elise" Zhang

In-universe information
- Class: Damage
- Origin: Xi'an, China
- Nationality: Chinese

Dr. Mei-Ling Zhou, commonly referred to as Mei (/meɪ/), is a character who first appeared in the 2016 video game Overwatch, a Blizzard Entertainment–developed first-person hero shooter. Originally conceived as a Canadian bounty hunter named "Frostbite" who encased her targets in ice, she was changed due to the developers feeling a light tone was necessary for the character, and redesigned her as a Chinese scientist. Voiced by Yu "Elise" Zhang, Mei is stationed in Antarctica as part of the efforts of "Overwatch", a global peace-keeping force, to monitor climate change. After being revived from cryopreservation, she helps the reformed group combat a global threat, utilizing a pistol that can either generate ice beams or generate ice constructs, accompanied by her sentient drone Snowball. Since her introduction, she has appeared in various spinoff media related to the franchise, including comics and merchandise, and later in another Blizzard developed title, Heroes of the Storm.

Mei as a character has been well received since release, particularly by Chinese audiences. Her appearance as a plus-sized Asian woman has also received praise, cited as a point for female diversity in gaming. However, criticism arose when the game's sequel seemingly slimmed her figure down. In 2019, due to the Blitzchung controversy involving Blizzard, Mei's image was used to express support for Hong Kong during protests occurring within the country, pushed as a "pro-democracy" symbol on social media platforms and displayed by protestors outside the BlizzCon 2019 event.

== Conception and development ==
Mei's design changed drastically from its earliest draft due to the developers feeling Overwatch had too many "serious" characters.

Mei was first announced in October 2015 at BlizzCon; along with D.Va and Genji, she was one of the last heroes who was introduced into Overwatch prior to its official release. The concept started from a desire to have an ice or cold user in the game's roster. This extended as far back as the original pitch for Overwatch, "Prometheus", with the proposed character "Frost", a fully masked figure with a winter coat armed with an ice axe and able to generate ice patches and walls. Though the character was excluded from the finalized planned roster, the concept was later revisited by artist Justin Thavirat as a character codenamed "Frostbite", a Canadian mountaineer bounty hunter that would that would capture her targets in ice. While the development team was excited by the idea, her design came across as too intimidating, and feeling the game had too many "serious" characters redesigned her with a lighter tone in mind.

Assistant Art Director Arnold Tsang drew several drafts modifying the design. Game director Jeff Kaplan suggested making the character possibly Chinese, wanting to avoid nationalities stereotypically associated with chilly environments such as Canada or Norway, and Tsang took inspiration from China's Harbin International Ice and Snow Sculpture Festival to flesh out this aspect. Lead writer Michael Chu after considering her intended abilities suggested making her a "plucky, nerdy scientist kind of character" that manipulated ice to get to hard to reach locations in the field, much to the development team's delight. With artist Ben Zhang developing her equipment, she was originally armed with a large two handed cannon carried underhand. However, Tsang felt it and aspects of her outfit made her silhouette resemble another character too much, Zarya, while other developers felt it seemed too refined for her character. Her weapon was revised to seem "cobbled together" and hand crafted, changed to a one handed pistol which not only made her silhouette unique, but also freed her other hand for abilities and gestures. A sentient drone, Snowball, was added to give her a fun "sidekick" to interact with, with Zhang creating several designs, including one resembling a rabbit, in an attempt to find something "endearing but not overly expressive" that wouldn't be distracting during gameplay.

Her personality was partially inspired by her voice actress, Yu "Elise" Zhang. During a recording session, after she flubbed a line she told both Chu and the sound engineer "Sorry, sorry, sorry." Chu felt this was a great line for the character, and added additional lines to portray Mei as apologetic, both sincerely and sarcastically, for her actions in-game. Additionally the animator assigned to her, David Gibson, drew inspiration from characters such as Rapunzel and Giselle from the films Tangled and Enchanted respectively, namely their "Disney princess vibe" but also their innocent and clumsy aspects that made one want to "spend time with [them]" according to Gibson. Additional influence came from Yomiko Readman of the anime Read or Die at Tsang's suggestion, with Gibson adding an aversion to fighting but being forced to do so to Mei's character.

=== Design ===
Standing 5 feet 3 inches tall, Mei is a Chinese woman with brown hair tied into a bun with an ornate pin holding it together on the back of her head, while the front of her hair is shorter, framing her face. She wears a large white and blue parka with a pouch belt across the waist, while a journal is strapped to the parka's right upper arm. Thick blue gloves cover her hands and wrists, while her blue pants are covered by thick grey boots with spikes extending from the soles. The outfit as a whole has light blue highlights, while her shoulders and upper gloves have ornate detailing. A large tube is strapped to her back, angled to the left, while the underside connects to her pistol, Snowball rests in a compartment in the top. She additionally wears glasses, an element Tseng added to her character "for fun" but kept after it resonated with the team and they felt it was "an adorable way to portray this brilliant scientist." Mei is also notably more overweight than most other female characters in the game, something Tsang wanted to do to not only help define her silhouette but also introduce more diversity into the game's roster. For Overwatch 2, her design was changed, reducing the frills on the coat, removing the belt and overall increasing the amount of blue throughout the outfit.

Like other Overwatch characters, Mei received skins, unlockable cosmetic items to change her in-game appearance. To this end they developed skins that referenced her cultural background or abilities, such as the firefighter themed "Rescue Mei" skin which was designed to not only tie into the nature of her weapon and skills but also help maintain her character's silhouette. Meanwhile, the "Chang'e" skin as part of the in-game Year of the Rooster celebration reimagines her with a traditional Chinese hairstyle and long flowing outfit meant to reference the Chinese moon goddess of the same name. Prior to the launch of the 2021 Overwatch League season, a new skin for Mei was released based on a mixed martial arts (MMA) outfit, named "MM-Mei". The skin gave Mei cornrows, a hairstyle common to people of African descent, but also had been used by MMA Chinese fighter Zhang Weili. Some players criticized the skin as cultural appropriation, and further expressed their frustration alongside it that at that point the game had yet to feature a female playable character of African-descent.

== Appearances ==
Dr. Mei-Ling "Mei" Zhou is a Chinese woman first appearing in the 2016 first-person shooter Overwatch, and later its sequel. Originating from Xi'an, China, Mei is part of the global peace-keeping force "Overwatch", and monitored climate change in their base in Antarctica. However, after a storm damaged the facility, Mei and the other scientists realize they lack sufficient resources to wait for a rescue and decide to enter cryostasis. Mei is the only survivor among them after help arrives a decade later, and with Overwatch having disbanded during her absence, she elects to carry on their work on her while accompanied by her sentient drone, Snowball. Later after Overwatch reforms, she returns to help them fight a new global threat called "Null Sector". In 2016, a seasonal event was added to the games with "Mei's Snowball Offensive", in which all players play as Mei, and their weapons are replaced with single-shot snowball throwers that require randomly spawning piles of snow to reload.

In related media to the franchise, Mei appears in the Overwatch animated shorts Rise and Shine in 2017, an expanded retelling of her origin story, and Zero Hour in 2019, which shows her helping to fight against "Null Sector" and bringing down their massive 'Titan' robot. In December 2017, Mei appeared alongside the character Winston in the comic Yeti Hunt, which served as a tie-in for a winter-themed seasonal event in the game. Outside of Overwatch, Mei was added to Blizzard's multiplayer online battle arena game Heroes of the Storm in June 2020.

=== Gameplay ===
In Overwatch, Mei is classified as a Damage-class character, designed to provide a more offensive role in team compositions. She was originally classified as a Defense-class character before it and the Offense-class were combined into one classification. Her primary weapon is an "Endothermic Blaster", a one handed short pistol that can either fire a short-range ice beam that will damage and slow the movement speed of enemies it hits, or can fire a long-range icicle projectile that does increased damage. Of note, in the original game the ice beam could also freeze enemies in place, however this effect was removed with the release of Overwatch 2. In Overwatch 2, Mei temporarily reduces the amount of healing an enemy receives when she damages them, due to a new passive ability given to all Damage-class characters.

Mei also has several abilities that require activation, though the first two have a "cooldown" period after use and are unable to be used again during that duration. The first, "Cryo Freeze", encases her in ice for a short duration, preventing her from moving or activating abilities while active but also healing her and preventing incoming damage. "Ice Wall" on the other hand will create a wide block of ice that not only impedes movement but blocks attacks during its duration or until it is destroyed. Lastly, her 'ultimate' ability, called "Blizzard", requires to be charged before use. The ability charges slowly during the course of gameplay, and can be charged faster through damage dealt to the enemy team. Once activated, it will cause Snowball to generate an area of effect attack that will damage enemies within the affected area while active, slowing them and freezing any that remain in the area too long, and lasts until its duration expires or the drone is sufficiently damaged.

For Heroes of the Storm, the developers wanted to reimagine her as a "tank" style character, able to withstand hits and draw enemy fire. To this end while they kept many of her abilities the same several others were tweaked. Two additional abilities were also added: "Icing", in which she generates ice on the ground to slide forward, and an optional Snowball 'ultimate' that generates a large snowball that rolls forward, capturing and pulling enemies hit with it to its final destination while damaging them.

== Promotion and reception ==
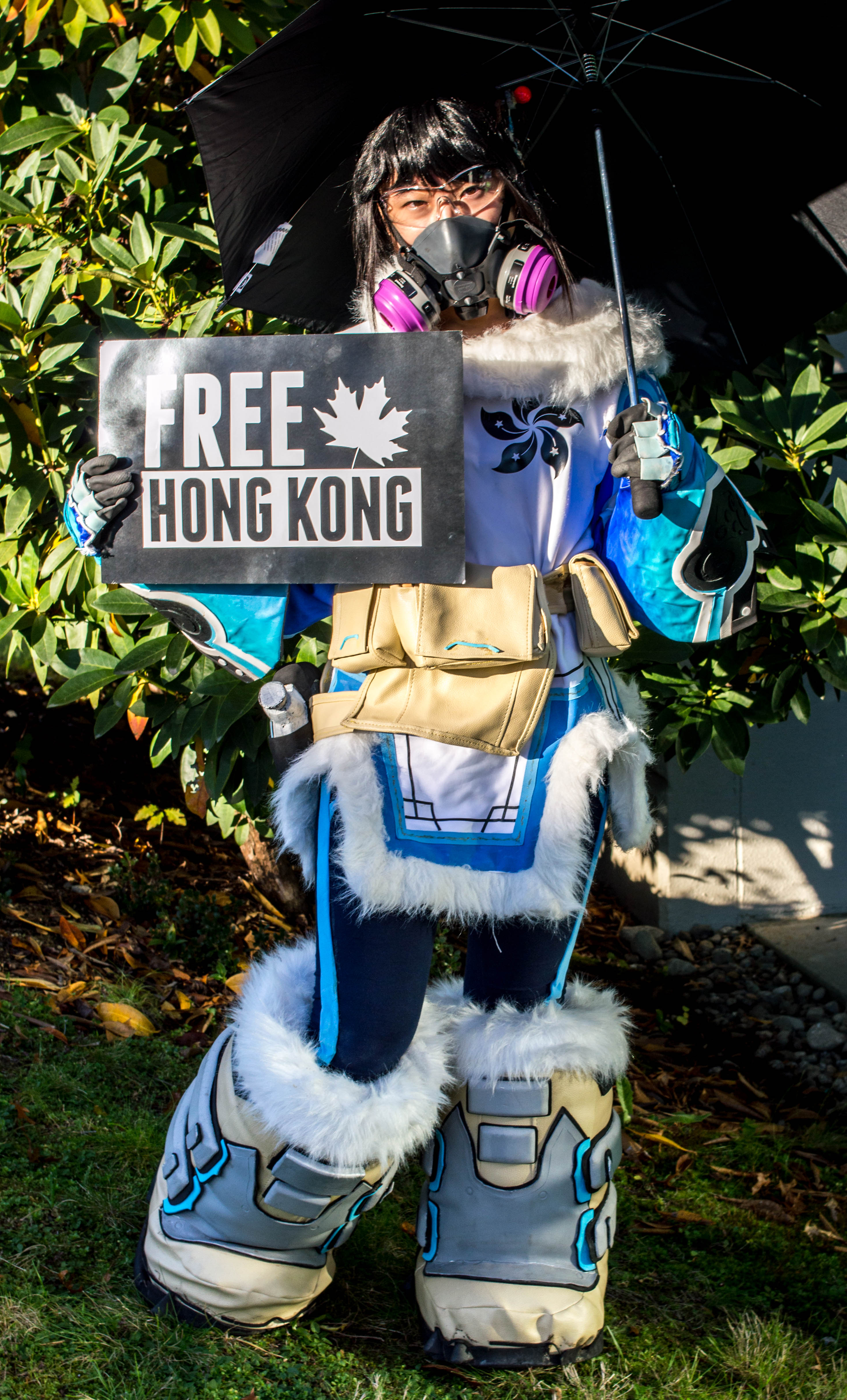
Cosplayer Zephronica depicting Mei in support of "Free Hong Kong".

Mei was featured at BlizzCon 2015's "What's New" panel, and has been featured on additional material including a cosplay guide and promotional images themed around holidays, as well as Funko Pop and Nendoroid figures in 2017. A toy of Snowball was released in 2018, utilizing a magnetic field to make it levitate a short distance while its eyes would change expression based on interaction. In 2022, Lego planned to release a set featuring Mei based on the events of the Zero Hour short, however the set was cancelled due to workplace allegations raised against Blizzard by former employees.

Mei was well received since her introduction by Chinese players in particular, who considered her background, combined with her pet phrase "Our world is worth fighting for", portrayed a positive image of a woman determined to protect the world. In his book Open World Empire, University of British Columbia professor Christopher B. Patterson cited Mei as an example of how characters in the game were both "stereotypical and homage", with her scientific background and behavior often considered a stereotype of Asian cultures despite her gender undermining the image of China's primarily male scientific field. He further added that through gameplay, these stereotypes instead became camp due to her "bubbly voice and cheery lines" acting as a form of psychological warfare in the eyes of players who saw her instead as "a psychopath who takes pleasure in binding and slowly torturing her victims." He noted that through the character he grew to appreciate Chinese culture more, and saw characters like Mei as an example of a character players were not supposed to identify as, but with, and explore their affinities and aspirations.

While Mei has been praised for having a non-uniform plus sized compared to other female characters in the game, this drew some criticism from Chinese players who questioned why she was not as slim as other female characters in the game. On the other hand, some such as Matthew Rodriguez of Kotaku criticized the handling of this aspect as the games have progressed, through some of Mei's in-game dialogue but also particularly in regards Overwatch 2 where she seems to have been made visibly slimmer. TheGamer's editor-in-chief Stacey Henley elaborated further on the latter complaint, noting that while this was also a factor of several alternate skins in the original Overwatch, "in a game full of slim and slender feminine ideals, Mei was doing it for the big girls." However, with the sequel, her coat and body had been made visibly slimmer while her face had become more defined with sharper features in Henley's eyes, who further stated it ruined her aesthetic appeal. She closed with "We have lots of slim, beautiful women in Overwatch to play as. We have no one else like Mei."

On October 6, 2019, Blizzard suspended professional Hearthstone player Chung "Blitzchung" Ng Wai for making statements in support of the ongoing protests in Hong Kong during a Grandmasters livestream interview, with Blizzard asserting that Blitzchung had violated rules related to their behavior and respecting Blizzard's image. Blizzard's actions were criticized globally, and as part of the reactions, Hong Kong protesters and others began to illustrate Mei as a supporter of the protests as a show of solidarity against Blizzard's decision. A hashtag "#Meisupportshongkong" trended on social media websites such as Reddit and Twitter, while protesters appeared outside of BlizzCon in 2019, giving out shirts showcasing Mei holding the Hong Kong flag. Fan artists on said social media also contributed, drawing depictions of the character in opposition of the Chinese government and its policies in part to portray the character as a "pro-democracy" icon but also an attempt by some to goad China into banning Overwatch.
