= BioForge =

1995 video game

- The box art depicts an X-ray of the cyborg protagonist's hand.
- Developer: Origin Systems
- Publisher: Electronic Arts
- Director: Ken Demarest
- Producer: Eric Hyman
- Artist: Bruce Lemons
- Writer: Jack Herman
- Composer: John Tipton
- Platforms: Windows 95, MS-DOS
- Release: NA: March 29, 1995; EU: 1995
- Genre: Action-adventure
- Mode: Single-player

BioForge is a 1995 action-adventure game developed by Origin Systems and published by Electronic Arts for MS-DOS. BioForge was developed as an interactive movie which made use of motion capture, voice acting, and multiple camera angles. Set in the future, the player controls an amnesiac cyborg trying to escape the research facility where he is being held prisoner.

BioForge received mixed reviews. Work was started on a sequel for the game, which was then re-scoped as an expansion pack, and ultimately cancelled. BioForge was re-released on GOG.com in 2012.

== Story ==
=== Setting ===
Writer Jack Herman created a fictional universe as the setting for BioForge. The backstory is revealed in-game by reading the diaries of various non-player characters.

In the distant future, a group of scientists called the Mondites are attempting to overthrow the intergalactic government known as the Reticulum. The Mondites are conducting experiments in genetics and cybernetics in the hopes of blending man and machine into assassins for their plans.

Years before the game takes place, the Mondites intercept a distress call from a Reticulum spacecraft that self-destructed after encountering and reviving an alien lifeform which went on a hostile rampage. Through studying the black box and the remains, they discover the aliens' home world, a moon in a remote sector of the galaxy which they name Daedalus. The Mondites establish a base on Daedalus while investigating the ruins the aliens left behind; a sentient race known as the Phyxx who were long thought to be extinct.

The Mondites abduct people and imprison them on Daedalus for their experiments. A mad scientist called Dr. Mastaba is the base commander and head of the "ABA Project" (Assassin Biologically Augmented). Dr. Mastaba mutilates the bodies of his victims in an attempt to turn them into the ultimate killing machine. Until now, the subjects of Dr. Mastaba's experiments have ended up either dead or insane.

Using technology borrowed from the Phyxx, the Mondites have finally succeeded in their experiments. However, when one of the aliens is accidentally revived from suspended animation in its tomb, it goes on a rampage through the complex, damaging the reactor and killing half of the base personnel in the process.

=== Plot ===
The player takes on the role of a cyborg (Experimental Unit AP-127) who awakens in a cell on Daedalus with no prior memories. After escaping the cell, the protagonist discovers that he is one of the few survivors of an incident which devastated the station. The player must unravel the truth about himself, the research station, the Mondites that control it, and the mysterious alien race which once inhabited the moon.

The game ends after the player escapes Daedalus in an experimental Mondite spacecraft in the wake of the moon's destruction, along with several Phyxx ships.

== Gameplay ==
An in-game quote showing the dark nature of the game when the player chooses to kill a guard whose life can be spared.

BioForge centers mainly on exploration and puzzle solving using items, and also on fighting and interaction with non-player characters (NPCs). The objective is not obvious at the beginning, since the player is unaware of his identity, which depends on his actions during the game. The player has full control over the main character's actions. This was a deliberate idea of Ken Demarest and Jack Herman. Richard Garriott helped kick off the interactive movie theme. In a 1994 magazine article, he said "Interactive Movies have become a buzzword, so it's being applied to games which really aren't. Just because a game has FMV that doesn't automatically make it an interactive movie, because you have very little control over the actor. Neither is a game in which you click on an icon, then sit back and watch a scene take place."

BioForge has tank controls as in the player character can rotate left and right, walk and run forwards and backwards, and sidestep. The player can also enter a combat stance that makes several punch and kick movements and hand-to-hand weapons (if carried) available to use. The combat system has been described as being similar to Alone in the Dark.

The body of the player character has an exchangeable (and depletable) battery that powers various body functions put there by the experimenters. Functions include a regeneration system that heals all damage when activated, as well as a powerful projectile weapon (known as the PFD Prototype). Upgrading and swapping the battery is key to the player's progress at certain points in the game. The player can also don a protective armoured suit that enables him to survive the harsh atmosphere outside the facility and explore the archaeological dig.

Various objects, such as datalogs or healing packs, can be picked up and stored in the player's inventory. Selected objects are shown carried in the left hand of the player character. Several hand-to-hand and ranged weapons, as well as batteries and other large or one-use objects, can also be picked up during the game, but only one can be carried, using the right hand, and they cannot be stored in the inventory.

Much of the game's plot is revealed by finding and reading logs on PDAs and notes left behind by characters, including accounts of experimental subjects losing their memories and lapsing into insanity. As the plot progresses, the main character automatically updates his own diary/log and summarizes what he has discovered since the beginning and what has happened for the player to review, an event marked by a sound cue.

Lex entering the time-critical reactor chamber puzzle in the protective armoured suit.

A large portion of the puzzle element relies on accessing control and computer terminals in order to remotely control robots, open doors and bypass security systems. The puzzles are integrated with the plot which means several have a time limit.

== Development ==
Director Ken Demarest had the core idea for BioForge whilst working as a programmer on Ultima VII: The Black Gate. Demarest felt Ultima VII had too much freedom, and that making an interactive movie with synthetic actors would create a more immersive game. BioForge was developed at Origin by a core team of ten people under Demarest, during a period of two years from February 1993 to March 1995. The game was developed using C++ and 80x86 assembly and used the Phar Lap DOS extender. Internally, the game used a custom script language for world management and animation. It also employed an HTML-styled language to code the in-game interface. The working title for the game was Interactive Movie 1.

The 3D models of BioForge were created from reference sketches in 3D Studio and then texture-mapped in a proprietary Electronic Arts tool named EOR. The animations were created using the rotoscope technique on live-actor movements captured with the Flock of Birds on-body motion detector system, using an in-house pose editor named System for Animating Lifelike Synthetic Actors (S.A.L.S.A.) that was capable of displaying captured movement as fully rendered models in real time. Origin reportedly paid between $30,000 and $32,000 for the Flock of Birds hardware in order to save time on creating animations.

SFX and music was created and composed by John Tipton.

=== Technical details ===
The character's appearance changes according to damage.

BioForge uses a software-only 3D engine to draw polygonal objects and characters against pre-rendered backdrops with a fixed resolution of 320x200 pixels in 256 colors.

Other technical details also worthy of note are:

- As a character gets more and more injured in combat, wounds and blood appear on the model, which will also limp or move awkwardly, indicating its overall health (effects that diminish when the player regains health).
- Laser blaster beams deflect intelligently off metal surfaces in scenes, often bouncing multiple times before dissipating.
- BioForge pioneered quaternion-based skeletal animation, with pose interpolation and interchangeable skeletons. This would later become a common technique in 3D computer and video games.

BioForge can be run reliably in the DOSBox PC emulator as of version 0.65.

=== Cancelled expansion pack ===
A sequel (BioForge II) was designed and the team were working on the art when the project was halted and changed to an expansion pack of the original game, BioForge Plus.

BioForge Plus was projected by Origin as an extension to the original game, which would directly continue the plot, but it was cancelled after a rushed beta was completed in 10 weeks. A former Origin employee said the company was going through a "hard year" in 1995 and that job and production team cuts resulted in the cancellation of BioForge Plus.

A Rock, Paper, Shotgun blog reported that EA Mythic received a crate full of old Origin Systems archive materials, possibly containing BioForge Plus source code.

== Reception ==
=== Reviews ===
Reception

Review scores
Publication	Score
Edge	7/10
Next Generation	3/5
PC Games (DE)	B
PC Zone	95/100
Electronic Games	C+
Computer Game Review	82/79/83

Reviews for BioForge at its release were mixed. More positive reviews summarized it as "a game that combines outstanding atmospherics with decent gameplay", and "incredibly well-rounded". Other reviewers noted problems, but considered the game worthwhile, saying "While it isn't perfect [...] it would be a mistake to ignore BioForge" and "flaws aren't enough to keep BioForge from being one of the most unusual and intriguing adventures of the year". Edge described it as "an enjoyable, but ultimately uninvolving experience". Elements such as the graphics, attention to detail, and interactivity received praise while the system requirements, combat, and controls drew criticism.

The game's graphics were described as "first-class", "superb", and "pretty close to top of the line". Next Generation noted that the characters "move and fight in a smooth, utterly convincing manner".

System requirements were mentioned by several reviewers. Electronic Games noted that the game "devours more than 30-Meg of hard drive space to deliver a frequently clumsy combination of an RPG and one of the interactive movies which are so en vogue these days." Next Generation said "The game has some steep hardware requirements [...] but the payoff is impressive".

=== Awards ===
PC Gamer US nominated BioForge as its 1995 "Best Adventure Game", but it lost to Beavis and Butt-Head in Virtual Stupidity. It was the second-place finalist for Computer Game Review's 1995 "Role Playing Game of the Year" award, which went to Anvil of Dawn. The editors wrote, "[I]n a year that held few RPGs for a starved audience, it had the guts to try role-playing in a sci-fi universe instead of one plagued with magic and dragons."

=== Legacy ===
Tim Schafer cited BioForge as an influence on the critically acclaimed 1998 game Grim Fandango in its approach to 3D graphics and use of tank controls.

PC Gamer UK ranked BioForge at 88 in its Top 100 PC games in 2001, noting that it "pushed boundaries at the time". BioForge was included as one of the titles in the 2010 book 1001 Video Games You Must Play Before You Die. The Guardian included BioForge in a 2014 list of the "greatest video games that time forgot" calling it a "fascinating example" among the "nightmarishly unplayable dross" of the mid-90s interactive movie genre.

In 2013, director Ken Demarest reflected "BioForge was conceived from a technical perspective, and I think that if I’d given as much focus to the gameplay as the underlying technology, it might have enjoyed greater acclaim."
