= Wings of Glory =

1995 video game

- Developer: Origin Systems
- Publisher: Electronic Arts
- Director: Bill Baldwin
- Producer: Warren Spector
- Writer: Lisa Smith
- Composer: Laura Barratt
- Platform: MS-DOS
- Release: 1995
- Genre: Combat flight simulator
- Mode: Single-player

Wings of Glory is a World War I combat flight simulator video game for MS-DOS developed by Origin Systems and published by Electronic Arts in 1995. The game uses Origin's RealSpace engine, which was first used in Strike Commander.

== Gameplay ==
The player begins the game as an American novice newly arrived in England who must take part in numerous missions, which involve taking off, completing certain objectives, then returning to base. The various planes that can be piloted are realistic for the time period; the starting plane is a lowly Sopwith Pup, with more advanced planes becoming available as the game progresses. Each plane has its own machine gun and some are able to drop bombs. The gameplay is primarily in first-person with an option to switch to third-person.

In addition to the main campaign there is a Gauntlet mode where the objective is to survive for as long as possible against a constant wave of enemies. There is also a level editor where the player can create their own missions.

== Reception ==
PC Gamer gave it a score of 92%, saying, "Wings of Glory isn't just the most realistic-feeling World War I flight sim on the market, it's also a carefully crafted homage to the great aerial epics of the '20s and '30s" and "Quibbles aside, Origin has given us another superb product in Wings of Glory". Computer Gaming World gave it a score of 90%, noting that a post-release patch fixed a lot of the initial complaints.
