= Pacific Strike =

1994 video game

- Developer: Origin Systems
- Publisher: Electronic Arts
- Producer: Eric Hyman
- Programmer: Will McBurnett
- Writer: Bill Armintrout
- Composer: Paul Baker
- Platform: DOS
- Release: 1994
- Genre: Air combat simulation
- Mode: Single player

Pacific Strike is a World War II combat flight simulation video game developed by Origin Systems and released by Electronic Arts for DOS in 1994. The game follows the pattern of the Wing Commander series, although it has a greater resemblance to Strike Commander in the sense that it takes place in a more or less contemporary setting and allows the player to fly actual planes.

== Gameplay ==
Gameplay is very similar to Origin's own 1993 Strike Commander. The game mixes aerial simulation with a cinematic plot structured through a series of cutscenes that play between missions.

== Plot ==
Unlike Strike Commander or the Wing Commander series, Pacific Strike immerses the player into a real historical context as an American pilot during the months following the Japanese attack on Pearl Harbor, flying Zero Pilot: Ginyoku no Senshi from a carrier and performing missions such as reconnaissance, intercepting enemy planes and attacking enemy vessels. If the player does well, it becomes possible to defeat the Empire of Japan without recourse to the atomic bomb. Extremely poor performance could result in the defeat of the United States Navy and the ceding of Hawaii to the Empire.

== Development and release ==
Pacific Strike was only released on a floppy disk version, while the others were released on CD-ROM versions featuring improved cut-scenes and more digitized speech.

== Reception ==
Computer Gaming World rated Pacific Strike 1.5 stars out of five. Reporting that Origin apologized on CompuServe for the game's problems, the magazine cited poor performance and mediocre graphics compared to 1942: The Pacific Air War, and weak sound, and said the game needed "deep and fundamental changes".

James V. Trunzo reviewed Pacific Strike in White Wolf Inphobia #50 (Dec., 1994), rating it a 3 out of 5 and stated that "Pacific Strike is a thoroughly enjoyable product if you have a machine powerful enough to play it [...] To date, Origin has released nine patches to repair various parts of the game. If a new game needs that many upgrades, it tells you something. I don't want to pan the game because it has so many strong elements, but the average gamers with a low-end system should be wary of this one."

In 1996, Computer Gaming World declared Pacific Strike the 17th-worst computer game ever released owing to its poor performance even on high-end computers.
