= NetStorm: Islands At War =

1997 video game

- Developer: Titanic Entertainment
- Publisher: Activision
- Producers: Jonathan Knight; Jason Kay
- Designers: Tony Bratton; Ken Demarest; Steven Moore
- Artist: Beverly Garland
- Composer: Mark Morgan
- Platform: Windows
- Release: NA: November 13, 1997; EU: 1997
- Genre: Real-time strategy
- Modes: Single player, Multiplayer

NetStorm: Islands At War, also known as just NetStorm, is a real-time strategy Windows game, developed by Titanic Entertainment and published by Activision in 1997. Although a single-player campaign and tutorial missions are included, Netstorm is chiefly designed for online play, allowing for games of up to eight players.

== Gameplay ==
A High Priest being sacrificed on an Altar

Few moving units are used, in contrast to other real-time strategy games, such as Command & Conquer. The battle area consists of a number of islands, each one controlled by an individual player. Each player has a priest unit which the enemy must capture and sacrifice using their own priest.

Players' resources are increased by collecting power in the form of "storm crystals", which can be used to build new units. The player starts the game with a limited number of units available; upon sacrificing an enemy priest, the player gains knowledge of new more powerful units for use in future battles.

There are several classes of units, including offensive units, defensive units and transport units. Only transport units can move; they are mainly used to collect the storm crystal from the "storm geysers" that appear randomly around the map.

Both the offensive and defensive units are static, in that once placed, they cannot be moved. Each offensive unit has an area or line of fire in which it can attack and destroy enemy units. Defensive units serve to provide cover to other offensive units while they make their attack.

Bridges are a key part of the game and are used to advance your position and gain access to other areas of the battlefield. Units can be constructed at the terminal points of the bridges, and further bridges can then be built from the placed unit.

The ultimate objective is to use offensive units to immobilize the enemy priests by damaging them. After this, they can be captured by a transport unit and taken to a sacrificial altar, where they are sacrificed in exchange for knowledge of more powerful units. The game ends when all enemy priests are killed or players declare a draw. Throughout the game players are free to choose to ally with other players for mutual benefit, in which case a co-operative victory is possible.

== Story ==
NetStorm takes place in the world of Nimbus, a planet whose crust has been sent floating off into the atmosphere by the never-ending battles between the four god-like beings called "The Furies", representing Sun, Wind, Rain and Thunder. The people now live on small floating islands, each with its own high priest; their only link to their patron Fury. The islands battle each other in order to capture and sacrifice the priests of their enemies to their own Fury so they may gain knowledge and power.

== Reception ==
Reception

Review scores
Publication	Score
CNET Gamecenter	8/10
Computer Games Strategy Plus	3/5
Computer Gaming World	3.5/5
Game Informer	8.25/10
GameRevolution	C+
GameSpot	7.1/10
GameStar	68%
Next Generation	4/5
PC Gamer (UK)	68%
PC Gamer (US)	83%

The game received above-average reviews. Next Generation said that the game was "not only something different in a crowded market, but it's also well thought through and fun as hell to play. Kudos to Titanic for bucking the trend, even if it's only a little." GamePro said, "While the real-time strategy genre may soon burst at the seams with titles, NetStorm's impressive Internet support and novel gameplay, which mixes solid strategy and quick thinking, help it stand apart from the rest." (Note: GamePro gave the game two 4/5 scores for graphics and sound, and two 4.5/5 scores for control and fun factor.)

The game was a commercial flop, with sales of 13,500 units in the U.S. by April 1999, according to PC Data. Activision's Peter Karpas remarked at the time that "NetStorm suffered from poor timing. It came out before Internet gaming had really broken through, other than for Doom and Quake. This made it a difficult sell."

The game was nominated for the "Best Online Game" award at the CNET Gamecenter Awards for 1997, which went to Ultima Online.
