= Knights of Legend =

1989 video game

- Developer: Origin Systems
- Publisher: Origin Systems
- Designer: Todd Porter
- Platforms: Apple II, Commodore 64, MS-DOS
- Release: October 1989: Apple II, C64; 1990: MS-DOS
- Genre: Role-playing
- Mode: Single-player

Knights of Legend is a fantasy role-playing video game developed and published by Origin Systems. It was released in 1989 for the Apple II and Commodore 64, followed by an MS-DOS conversion in 1990. The game was designed by Todd Porter. It was planned to be the first in a series, but no further games were released.

== Plot ==
The game is set in the fictional land of Ashtalarea, where the evil Pildar has imprisoned the Duke, the ruler of the land, and Seggallion, a knight who had stopped Pildar in the past. The player leads a band of adventurers who try to free the prisoners and stop Pildar.

== Gameplay ==
The game is mostly tactical, with role-playing elements. The classic races of dwarves, elves and humans available for players to make up their party of adventurers. The game also adds a novel race called "Kelder" or "Kelderheit" that has the power of flight.

On the role-playing side, characters can converse with the inhabitants of towns, learn about local lore, purchase equipment, and pay to get trained in different skills. Quest-givers in various towns direct players to specific locations of the larger world surface, which lead to pre-made battlefields where an item is set to be retrieved to complete the mission. There are also random combat encounters when traveling outside towns.

On the tactical side, each combat round comprises planning thrusts, parries and jumps. The actions of each character (player and monster) are set prior to the combat round. The "foresight" may reveal the set actions of slower characters (who select actions for the round first). After all character choices are set, the combat round is then executed with the pre-selected actions. Additionally, combat incorporates the concept of extensive use of fatigue. Fatigue reduces a character's effectiveness and will cause them to pass out if it reaches zero. Each quest site battlefield has a tactical feel similar to later tactical role-playing games and the Jagged Alliance series: visibility is limited to what each character can actually see.

In order to save current game progress, the player's character must be resting at an inn.

== Reception ==
In the March 1990 edition of Dragon (Issue #155), Hartley, Patricia, and Kirk Lesser, who normally assigned ratings from 1 to 5, gave the Apple II version a rating of "X" for "Not recommended", pointing out the many bugs in the programming that slowed gameplay to a crawl. Two issues later, the Lessers gave the PC/MS-DOS version of the game a perfect score of 5 out of 5.

In the June 1990 edition of Games International (Issue 15), Theo Clarke found the game too buggy to complete, calling it "one of those sad cases where the implementation fails to support its creators' vision." He gave the game a very poor rating of 4 out of 10.

Scorpia of Computer Gaming World in 1991 and 1993 called it "tactical wargaming with a thin veneer of role-playing". She stated that the constant combat became "tedious", and only recommended it for "wargamers or devoted hack'n'slashers".
