= Wizadore =

1985 video game

- Cassette inlay
- Developer(s): Chris Roberts
- Publisher(s): Imagine Software
- Platform(s): BBC Micro
- Release: 1985
- Genre(s): Action
- Mode(s): Single-player

Wizadore is a video game developed by Imagine Software and released on cassette tape for the BBC Micro home computer in 1985. It was developed by Chris Roberts (then aged 16 and his first commercially successful game) and released by Imagine Software in February 1985 for the BBC Micro home computer and became a best seller.

== Gameplay ==
Wizadore is a simple side-scrolling platform game with a three-item inventory. The player's character is a mage whose grandfather created a sword to kill Smaun, an evil dragon, but which has been broken into three parts and must be collected in order to be used. Players need to jump across gaps and climb ladders to collect various weapons and scrolls to defeat guards armed with axes and swords and soldiers riding flying creatures that drop weapons. To advance through the game, players need to juggle their inventory carefully as certain weapons only kill certain types of enemy. Archers remain invulnerable and the player needs to jump over their arrows. The timing of jumps was critical and needed to be almost pixel-perfect to avoid dying. The combination of the climb and jump key added a level of difficulty.

== Prizes ==
As a marketing ploy, Wizadore offered a monthly prize of £100 to people who completed it (up to the end of August 1985).
