= Mike McShaffry =

Video game programmer

Mike McShaffry is a video game programmer, entrepreneur and author. He is known as the director of Ultima VIII: Pagan. He graduated from the University of Houston and began his video game industry career working for Origin Systems in 1990. He worked on titles such as Martian Dreams, Ultima VII: The Black Gate, Ultima VIII: Pagan, Ultima IX: Ascension and Ultima Online. In 1997 he formed his own company Tornado Alley. He has since worked at Glass Eye Entertainment, producing Microsoft Casino.

== Bibliography ==
- Game Coding Complete, (2009) ISBN 978-1-58450-680-5
