= Ultima Worlds Online: Origin =

Cancelled video game

Ultima Worlds Online: Origin (UWO:O) — originally titled Ultima Online 2 (UO2) — was to be the first sequel to the popular 1997 massively multiplayer online role-playing game Ultima Online. Origin Systems revealed that they were developing UO2 in September 1999 for release within a year or two, but development was cancelled on March 21, 2001.

UO2 was to be set in Sosaria but in an alternate timeline where a cataclysm has collided the past, present and future of Sosaria into a single world, thus bringing Industrial-Revolution and steampunk elements to the medieval fantasy world. Players would have been able to choose from three playable races:

- Juka - warriors from the Logos, the land of technology governed by Blackthorn
- Meer - magically adept beings from ancient Sosaria
- Humans - from Britannia.

UO2, billed as a "2nd generation MMORPG", was to improve upon Ultima Online and previous MMORPGs. The most noticeable advancement was the competitive 3D engine that replaced UO's aging isometric view. The design also changed several aspects that players voiced dislike for in the original UO. In UO2, player vs. player combat was to be disabled by default (except in special areas, such as arenas). The game also would have emphasized grouping, including groups of 20-30 players, and reduced the ability of single players to become all-around grand-masters (i.e., prevent the notorious "tank-mage" characters that appeared in UO).

In March 2001, Electronic Arts (parent company of Origin) announced that development on Ultima Worlds Online: Origin would cease in order to provide additional support for Ultima Online. Shortly after, EA announced it had laid off 200 employees including some at Origin Systems. EA feared that UO2 would compete for subscribers with UO, which was still profitable and not showing signs of slowing down. About one-third of the team that worked on UO2 joined Destination Games to work on Richard Garriott's MMORPG, Tabula Rasa. (Tabula Rasa ended up being canceled a year after going online in 2009).

Just a few years after Ultima Online 2 was canceled, history repeated itself when EA cancelled Ultima X: Odyssey in 2004.

Origin Systems used music by industrial band Grim Faeries, which featured Xtina X (Christina Petro of U2 fame), Mikee Plastik, and Curse Mackey for soundtrack work on the UO2 project. Their song Love Is Hell was used as the music on the first trailer for the game, which was released in a DVD format in the June 2000 issue of PC Gamer magazine. This helped propel the band to an international cult status among gamers and made that song a hit. Origins then funded a second GF track (Faerie Raide) to be remixed by the studio of Ken "HiWatt" Marshall (Skinny Puppy production guru), which was used for the music in the game's second trailer. Both of the official trailers can be found on YouTube and various gaming sites. Curse Mackey ultimately composed 38 pieces of music for U02.

== See also ==
- Ultima X: Odyssey
- Ultima Online
