= J. Allen Brack =

Video game developer

- Occupations: Video game developer, business executive
- Notable work: World of Warcraft

J. Allen Brack is a video game developer and former president of Blizzard Entertainment. He left his position at Blizzard in 2021 following allegations of sexual harassment taking place in the company.

== Career ==
In 1994, Brack began his career in the video game industry at Origin Systems, initially working as a quality assurance tester. Later he moved to the production team. In 2000, he joined Sony Online Entertainment, where he eventually became the producer on Star Wars Galaxies until he left in 2005. In 2006, Brack joined Blizzard Entertainment, where he held a variety of positions, mostly working on World of Warcraft. He served as the game's executive producer, before being appointed president of Blizzard Entertainment in October 2018. In 2019, Brack apologized for Blizzard's handling of the Blitzchung incident. In August 2021, he stepped down from his position as president, after Activision Blizzard was sued in July of the same year by the California Department of Fair Employment and Housing. The lawsuit asserted that the management created a "frat boy culture" that allowed gender-based discrimination and sexual harassment. In 2023, Brack founded Magic Soup Games, a new video game development company, with former colleagues Jen Oneal and John Donham.
