= Ultima X: Odyssey =

- Planned cover art
- Developer: Origin Systems
- Publisher: EA Games
- Series: Ultima
- Engine: Unreal Engine 2
- Platform: Microsoft Windows
- Release: Cancelled
- Genre: Massively multiplayer online role-playing game
- Mode: Multiplayer

Ultima X: Odyssey is an unreleased massively multiplayer online role-playing game (MMORPG) based in the Ultima universe, developed by Origin Systems for Electronic Arts.

== Development ==
Ultima X: Odyssey was officially announced on August 22, 2003. Despite being a multiplayer game, Ultima X was being marketed as a continuation of the Ultima series that was last visited with Ultima IX rather than as a sequel or replacement to the still commercially successful Ultima Online.

Ultima X: Odyssey was the first Ultima game developed after series creator Richard Garriott left Origin, and is the second Ultima-based MMORPG to be cancelled (Ultima Worlds Online: Origin — Ultima Online 2 — was cancelled in 2001). This followed in the wake of other MMORPG cancellations in 2004, including True Fantasy Live Online, Mythica, and Warhammer Online (which was revived in 2005).

Although scheduled to be released sometime in 2004, EA cancelled the project on June 30, 2004, after the closure of Origin and the layoffs of several employees, with a letter to fans on June 30, 2004:

Dear Ultima X: Odyssey community members, As of today, development on Ultima X: Odyssey has ended. We feel that Ultima Online is where we need to focus our online efforts and most of my team will be moving to the UO expansion pack, the UO live team, and an unannounced Ultima Online project. Development on UO will be greatly enhanced as we consolidate our resources behind that franchise. This isn't an easy decision but it's the right move for the future of all things Ultima, including the community and the team. We look forward to sharing our plans for the future of Ultima Online very soon. I would like to thank all of the Ultima X: Odyssey supporters who have been with us from the beginning. I hope you will continue to support the Ultima franchise and the development team as they transition to new projects. Thank you, David "InQWis" Yee Producer, Ultima X: Odyssey

Despite the letter, no plans of the future were ever shared or officially released for Ultima Online. Expansion packs were released at a later date; however, they made no mention of whether they were actually part of the future plans involved in the decision to cancel Ultima X.

== Engine ==
Ultima X: Odyssey was to use the lauded Unreal Engine. As with most MMORPGs, players would have had to pay a monthly fee to play it. Ultima X hoped to revitalize the MMORPG genre, which many have criticized as being full of EverQuest clones. For example, it promised exciting combat as opposed to the "press 'A' to auto-attack" found in many MMORPGs. The fiction stated that after Ultima IX, the Avatar created the new world called Alucinor in which Ultima X is set. Moongates throughout Alucinor would allow players to traverse the game world quickly and all players would have the ability to teleport their friends to their current location.

Drawing from the single-player Ultima games, Ultima X: Odyssey was to use the established Virtues of Ultima in addition to skills, experience points and levels. Players would be able to practice in the eight Virtues (Compassion, Honesty, Honor, Humility, Justice, Sacrifice, Spirituality, and Valor) and eventually reach the maximum level with it. If a player maxed out each Virtue, they became very powerful, attaining the power of the Avatar. This example, provided by EA during development, could help in understanding the Virtue system:

A hooded guy asks you to get his gold medallion back that has been in his family for centuries. He tells you who stole it and where that person could be found. Once you find the thief, he tells you that he only stole the medallion so he could sell it and buy bread to eat. From here you can either be Compassionate by giving him some bread, letting him live, but taking the medallion back; or practice Justice and kill him, taking the medallion to its rightful owner. When you return to the hooded guy who gave you the job, you find out the medallion isn't his, but another person's who got robbed by the foodless guy, and now you can either Honor the agreement and leave with your payment, or be Honest and take the medallion to its real owner, killing the person who gave you the job.

== Storyline ==
The storyline of the game was intended to begin immediately after the conclusion of Ultima IX. In the story, the Guardian and the Avatar are now one being, with both personalities battling to dominate the other and take control. The game itself would have taken place in a world inside the Avatar's mind (the world was called "Alucinor", which roughly translates from Latin "Wandering in the mind"), and the people in the world were tasked to follow the eight virtues in the hopes of aiding the Avatar in gaining the power to completely defeat the Guardian.

== Music ==
The orchestral score for the game was composed by Chris Field. Field also produced a soundtrack album, entitled "Ultima X Odyssey: Music by Chris Field", with an eighty-one piece orchestra. The orchestra was recorded in Bastyr Chapel in Seattle, Washington. The album included thirty-three pieces of music. A small portion (roughly six pieces of the original thirty three) of the musical pieces were later released as part of the online game for Lord of Ultima.

== See also ==
- Ultima Worlds Online: Origin (Ultima Online 2)
- Ultima Online
