= Windwalker (video game) =

1989 video game

- Developer: Origin Systems
- Publisher: Origin Systems
- Designer: Greg Malone
- Platforms: Amiga, Apple II, Apple IIGS, Atari ST, Commodore 64, MS-DOS, Mac
- Release: December 1989
- Genres: Role-playing, action
- Mode: Single-player

Windwalker is a 1989 action role-playing video game published by Origin Systems.

It is a sequel to Moebius: The Orb of Celestial Harmony.

== Gameplay ==
Windwalker is a game in which the player uses martial arts while seeking enlightenment.

The interface has been simplified when compared with Moebius. There are two combat modes, which the player can switch between: concentration (stop-action) and intuition (in real time).

There is an honor-based moral system. If the protagonist attacks unprovoked or steals, his honor is reduced. Low honor has practical consequences, such as villagers refusing to let him sleep in their homes. The player can raise the character's honor by performing certain prayers.

== Plot ==
The protagonist's goal is to restore Chao Ti to Kanthun's throne, while dealing with Zhurong.

== Reception ==
Dennis Owens reviewed the game for Computer Gaming World, and stated that "Windwalker is an excellent game for fans of Moebius and for anyone looking for a combination action/role-playing game with an Oriental flair and a gentleness of spirit."

Compute!'s Scott Miller described Windwalker's story as "richly detailed" and "captivating". He called attention to the level of realism in the fighting sequences, while acknowledging the animation is not as fluid as in dedicated martial arts games. Miller also praised the graphics, mentioning the horizon effect. Overall, the reviewer recommended it to players new to computer role-playing games, due to the relatively easy puzzles and manageable world size.
