= Moebius: The Orb of Celestial Harmony =

1985 video game

- Developer: Greg Malone
- Publisher: Origin Systems
- Designer: Greg Malone
- Platforms: Apple II, MS-DOS, Amiga, Atari ST, Commodore 64, Macintosh
- Release: 1985
- Genres: Role-playing, action
- Mode: Single-player

Moebius: The Orb of Celestial Harmony is a 1985 role-playing video game that combines tile-based exploration with action-based combat viewed from the side. It was designed and developed by Greg Malone, published by Origin Systems and originally released for the Apple II. Later versions were also published for the Amiga, Atari ST, Commodore 64, Macintosh, and MS-DOS.

It follows a martial artist who must recover the Orb of Celestial Harmony from the villain Kaimen.

Origin Systems later produced a sequel to the game, Windwalker.

== Gameplay ==
The villain Kaimen has stolen the Orb of Celestial Harmony and dominated the land of Khantun. The protagonist, a ninja warrior chosen to stop Kaimen, has trained with the Sword Master, the Martial Arts Master and the Zen Master.

The action takes place on the four elemental planes: Earth, Water, Air, and Fire, which the protagonist must traverse in order to recover the Orb. In addition to familiar character statistics such as dexterity, the protagonist has karma, a crucial attribute that goes up or down constantly depending on his deeds. Threatening a citizen with a sword or fleeing from battle, for example, lowers karma. By contrast, acts of bravery increase karma. Low karma can have negative effects, such as difficulty using magic and being shunned by monks.

There are 12 actions, which include punches, kicks and movement. The combat system is based on body energy; the first one to deplete all of their energy loses the fight. Attacks include using fireballs (only in shrines), throwing shuriken and swinging swords. Experience points are obtained from defeating enemies and increase the protagonist's attributes.

To use prayers, the protagonist has to fast and chant special mantras. These actions can trigger spells such as Speak with the Dead and Cure Sickness. Meanwhile, charms are activated using Mind energy and a certain component, such as tiger teeth. By doing so, other effects can be achieved, including Teleport and Paralysis.

== Reception ==
Reception

Review scores
Publication	Score
Dragon	4.5/5 (Macintosh)
Zzap!64	48% (C64)
Info	3/5 (C64)

COMPUTE! called Moebius "yet another program worth raving about" from Origin Systems, and a worthy follow-up to Ultima IV. It stated the game had excellent graphics, "challenging and functional" arcade combat, and "many hours of enjoyment" from the puzzles.

Computer Gaming World stated in 1986 that the game was "sort of an outgrowth or continuation of the best parts of Ultima with special emphasis on graphic detail ... The addition of a fully animated combat system was frosting on the cake". The magazine's Charles Ardai stated in 1987 that the martial-arts and RPG portions of Moebius "don't fit together very well, but each is individually enjoyable". Info gave the Commodore 64 version three stars out of five, stating that the "ambitious game ... has a decent storyline and the action is challenging". The magazine criticized Moebius's "Apple conversionitis, with blocky graphics, jerky animation, and a clumsy keyboard user interface". The game was reviewed in Dragon #141 (1989) by Hartley, Patricia, and Kirk Lesser in "The Role of Computers" column. The reviewers gave the game 4½ out of 5 stars.

Steve Fuelleman reviewed Moebius: The Orb of Celestial Harmony in Space Gamer/Fantasy Gamer No. 78. He praised the combat graphics, despite the "stop action" animation, as well as the controls and variety of fighting options. The reviewer was also positive about the plot's depth and the game's documentation. At the same time, Fuelleman pointed out how frustrating the experience could become, for example, when vital resources are behind numerous challenging obstacles. Nevertheless, he concluded by calling Moebius a "gem" and stating that its flaws "only add a little more fire to it."

Zzap!64 presented opinions from two reviewers: Julian Rignall and Nik Wild. Both of them expressed frustration with frequent disk loading that interrupted play, while pointing out the slow combat with overly easy enemies. While Rignall praised the overall premise and Wild highlighted the fine soundtrack, their impression was summarized as "an expensive package which sadly doesn't live up to its potential".

=== Sales ===
According to Origin Systems, by 1989 the game had sold nearly 70,000 copies.
