= Bad Blood (video game) =

1990 video game

- Cover art by Larry Elmore
- Developer: Origin Systems
- Publisher: Origin Systems
- Director: Chris Roberts
- Producer: Warren Spector
- Designers: Jeff George; Chris Roberts
- Programmer: Steven Muchow
- Artist: Daniel Bourbonnais
- Writer: Jeff George
- Composer: Steve Morris
- Platforms: MS-DOS, Commodore 64
- Release: 1990
- Genre: Action role-playing
- Mode: Single-player

Bad Blood is a post-apocalyptic action role-playing game for MS-DOS and Commodore 64 published by Origin Systems in 1990.

== Plot ==
A nuclear war has turned the world into a wasteland. The pure-blooded humans have retreated in large cities while mutants live in small villages on the plains where they make a living by hunting the many monsters. Now one of the human leaders, Lord Dominix, wants to start a war to wipe out all the "bad-blooded" mutants. Your village chief has assigned you with the task of preventing this war.

== Gameplay ==
Bad Blood is a top-down action-adventure. You can not create your own character but have to pick one of the three predefined ones: Varrigg (a strong green mutant who fights with his bare hands), Dekker (a human male armed with a knife) or Jakka (who looks human but fires laser beams from her eyes). The choice you make has only a limited impact on gameplay and storyline.

Gameplay consists of exploring the world map, visiting several cities and villages, talking with NPCs, picking up items and new weapons (shotguns, grenades, Uzis, etc.) and much real-time combat. The game has a day-night cycle which influences the amount of monsters on the plains and whether or not you can talk with some NPCs.

== Reception ==
Jim Trunzo reviewed Bad Blood in White Wolf #22 (Aug./Sept., 1990), rating it a 3 out of 5 and stated that "Bad Blood is a graphic delight with an interesting theme. For hard-core role-players, the game would have little appeal. For the masses, however, Bad Blood offers a relatively easy play and a high enjoyment quotient."

Charles Ardai reviewed the game for Computer Gaming World, and stated that "Bad Blood is nothing if not well-intended, but it fails for want of a spark of innovation, either in the story or the gameplay."
