= Ultima VIII: Pagan =

1994 video game

- Developer: Origin Systems
- Publisher: Origin Systems
- Director: Mike McShaffry
- Producer: Richard Garriott
- Designers: Andrew P. Morris; John Watson
- Programmer: Tony Zurovec
- Composer: Nenad Vugrinec
- Series: Ultima
- Platforms: DOS, PC-98
- Release: March 23, 1994 (DOS); 1995 (PC-98)
- Genre: Role-playing
- Mode: Single player

Ultima VIII: Pagan is a role-playing video game, released as the eighth part of the Ultima series. Released in 1994, it is a DOS-only title and is also the first game in the series to be rated M in North America. It was not as well-received as its predecessors, Ultima VII and Ultima VII Part Two: Serpent Isle.

It was re-released in 2012 on GOG.com with support for Windows and macOS via DOSBox.

== Plot ==
The Avatar in dialogue with the Titan Lithos. Ultima VIII uses an isometric third-person view similar to Ultima VII.

Following the defeat of the charismatic religious leader Batlin on Serpent Isle, the Guardian banishes the Avatar to a world that he has already conquered: Pagan. Ultima VIII has a much darker tone and a very different premise, in comparison to most of the Ultima games. The world of Pagan is entirely different from that of Britannia: the Virtues are not part of Pagan's culture, and the magic systems and monsters are entirely different.

The world of Pagan is in eternal twilight as the result of an ancient battle between the Elemental Titans and the evil "Destroyer", which resulted in the victory of the Titans. However, the people of Pagan had to pay a high price: the Titans had to henceforth be worshiped as gods. The Titans bestow powers on their most ardent followers, but they are otherwise cruel and unloving rulers, and their followers terrorize the general population.

Ultima VIII sets off where Ultima VII Part Two: Serpent Isle ended: The Guardian has grasped the Avatar from the Void, and now drops him into the sea of the world Pagan through a pentagram-shaped portal. In the introduction, the Guardian reveals his plot: "You have been a thorn in my side for far too long, Avatar. Your two worlds will be crushed. Britannia first, then Earth. I shall parade you before their conquered peoples as the fallen idol of a pathetic ideal. I banish you to the world of Pagan. No one here knows of the Avatar!"

The Avatar regains consciousness on the shore after being rescued from the sea by a fisherman (who turns out to be an important character later on in the plot). He soon witnesses the execution by beheading of a townsman, ordered by the tyrannic ruler of the region, Lady Mordea.

Later, visiting the wizard Mythran, he learns that there are four Titans on Pagan, each one having one of the Elements as his/her domain: Water (Hydros), Air (Stratos), Fire (Pyros) and Earth (Lithos). The more privileged followers of Lithos are identified as necromancers, the wizards that trap Pyros and tap him for their power as sorcerers, the followers of Stratos as theurgists and the (albeit highly selective) followers of Hydros as tempests. Apart from those, a fifth type of magic known as Thaumaturgy exists and is pioneered by Mythran. In order to escape Pagan, the Avatar has to overcome many obstacles and master the ways of all titans, finally becoming the Titan of Ether: the magical field and fifth element.

During his quests, the Avatar collects the four artifacts of the Titans, unleashing violent thunderstorms, hurricanes, earthquakes and meteor showers by doing so. These artifacts allow him to enter the Ethereal Plane and defeat the Titans in their own realms. The Avatar then reconstructs the original blackrock gate that originally allowed the Guardian to enter Pagan. By entering the reconstructed gate, the Avatar is teleported back to Britannia, which is now ruled by the Guardian, who is revealed to also be the "Destroyer".

== Development ==
Richard Garriott and others at Origin knew that Ultima sales weren't accelerating as fast as the rest of the market, so certain changes were made in the design of Ultima VIII to interest more people than hard-core Ultima fans. That's why the story took place away from Britannia, the scope of the game was drastically reduced, and the puzzles were more like what you'd expect in a game like Prince of Persia.

— Mike McShaffry, programmer on Ultima VIII

Richard Garriott later said he delegated most of the work on Ultima VIII to others: "I sacrificed everything to appease stockholders, which was a mistake. We probably shipped it three months unfinished." He reiterated this in 2016 saying that EA was not to be blamed for the game's poor reception. "It really was smart people with good data [and] good evidence to show 'here's why we've concluded this information. We would like you to embrace it'...and I embraced it!"

Pagan was the first Ultima game to feature an extensive amount of platforming. Due to the game's buggy nature, many of these areas were much more difficult to complete before a patch was released. The interactivity and role-playing elements from previous Ultimas are greatly reduced in the game, partly leading to its mixed reception. Some of the removed elements from earlier Ultimas include:

- The Avatar is a male with blond hair and blue eyes, in contrast to previous Ultimas, where the Avatar's gender and appearance could be chosen by the player.
- There is no party system, causing this to be the first main Ultima where the player adventures alone since Ultima II.
- Several weapons, including halberds, spears, slings, two-handed swords, bows and crossbows, are not in the game.
- There is no leveling or experience system in the game, and the Avatar's Strength, Dexterity and Intelligence are all increased through repetition. For example, attacking in combat repeatedly will eventually cause Strength and Dexterity to increase, and reading books or casting spells repeatedly will do the same for Intelligence.
- Horses, carts, and ships are all unavailable. The only methods of transportation are by foot, or by using the Recall Pads. Small skiffs are in the game, but they are not usable.
- Interacting with the world has been reduced. In Ultima VII, the player could do things like bake bread, forge swords, pick berries from bushes and sit in chairs. None of these can be done in Ultima VIII.
- Character portraits have been completely removed. They had been introduced in Ultima VI.
- The combat system does not involve any tactical planning or ability for automatic commands. Instead, combat is reduced to three moves - swing the Avatar's weapon (or fists), block, or kick.
- Searching through the inventory or casting spells does not pause the game, allowing enemies to attack while the player searches for items or casts spells.
- Food is no longer needed to survive. Instead, eating food slightly heals the Avatar.
- The game is more linear, requiring the player to progress through the story to gain access to other parts of Pagan. Previous Ultimas were largely sandbox games.
- Spellbooks were removed, as Pagan's magic system is completely different. Casting spells requires keeping several different items in the Avatar's backpack, and the preparation and casting of spells is much more time-consuming than in the other games.

== Release ==
Pagan was released on March 23, 1994. It was localized and sold in English, German, French, Spanish and Japanese variants.

=== Speech Pack ===
A Speech Pack add-on was released concurrently with the game. This pack adds spoken lines for certain key characters, such as the Guardian, the Titans and Khumash-Gor. The Speech Pack did not sell very well as a separate add-on, mostly because the CD-ROM Gold version of Ultima VIII, which was released shortly afterward, also includes the speech files. The speech files are also included in the later budget releases and the Ultima Collection release. The speech pack was available in English, German and French.

=== The Lost Vale ===
The Lost Vale expansion to Ultima VIII was planned from the outset, and was highly anticipated. The expansion would have begun upon entering a set of double doors that are present in the finished game but inaccessible. Despite being all but finished and ready for duplication, The Lost Vale was never released as it was canceled when the main game did not sell as well as had been expected.

Plot details released in 2005 indicate the Avatar would have had to free three additional Ancient Gods from a prison. A city in the clouds was going to be an accessible location, and the add-on would have featured an additional spell that would allow the Avatar to shrink to a very small size, allowing him to enter previously inaccessible areas. A magic bag of reagents was to be included as well, eliminating the need to find reagents to cast spells (similar to the Ring of Reagents from Serpent Isle's Silver Seed expansion pack).

A single Lost Vale game box surfaced in October 2005, and was confirmed to be genuine soon afterwards. It was auctioned on eBay for US$1923. Some low-resolution scans of the box are located on the web.

=== Support and legacy ===
A patch was later released to correct game bugs, fix some of the criticized plot holes and eliminate most of the problems with jumping. While the original release contained many moving platforms to be jumped across, only jumping over a fixed distance in eight directions was possible. The patch enabled jump distance to be targeted and stopped the motion of the platforms. In reference to the abundance of platform-jumping puzzles, long-time Ultima fans jokingly referred to Ultima VIII by the nickname Super Avatar Brothers, an allusion to Super Mario Bros..

In 1995, the Ultima VIII engine was reused for the Crusader game series.

Being a DOS title, Ultima VIII has problems running on modern systems such as Windows 98 and later; however, it works reliably under the DOSBox environment. Unlike Ultima VII which used Intel's undocumented "Big real mode" which became known as Voodoo Memory at Origin, Ultima VIII used a more conventional DOS extender. An open-source project called Pentagram aims to create an engine capable of running Ultima VIII on modern operating systems, most notably Windows, Mac OS X and Linux. In 2000 a developer, who claimed to have the source code, helped the Pentagram project with information about the internal structures of the game. In 2003 an anonymous developer offered the game's source code to the pentagram project to support their development, an offer which was rejected for legal reasons by the Pentagram project. In May 2020, the Pentagram engine was merged into ScummVM

Ultima 8 being played in the Pentagram open-source project. It includes an automap, shown here.

In April 2012 Pagan was re-released after years of commercial unavailability into the Digital distribution by gog.com. In April 2015 Pagan was also released for free on Origin, EA's digital distribution platform.

== Reception ==
Reception

Review scores
| Publication | Score |
|---|---|
| Dragon | 3/5 |
| PC Format | 92% |
| PC Gamer (US) | 78% |
| PC Zone | 78 out of 100 |
| PC Magazine | 3/4 |

Computer Gaming World said in June 1994 that "Though the imagery is gorgeous ... the Avatar's interaction with the world more resembles Prince of Persia" than previous Ultimas, the world was smaller, and the game lacked companions or traveling to other towns. The magazine predicted that action fans "will be pleasantly surprised ... but traditional RPGers and long-time Avatars" might not. Scorpia was much harsher in the next issue, stating that "If you were expecting characterization, rich story, role playing—you're expecting it from the wrong game". She concluded that "Pagan is a disaster, and an embarrassment to Origin, Lord British, and Ultima fans everywhere", and that she was not looking forward to a sequel.

Reviewing the game for PC Gamer US, Trent C. Ward wrote, "With its rich plot, superb animation, and great sound, Ultima VIII is one of the better action titles out there." However, he concluded that its "really strange mix of game play ... doesn't quite pay off." David McCandless of PC Zone argued that "Pagan is a game you will either love or hate." He summarized, "If you get into it, it will last you weeks and you'll think it's brill and you'll love it and you'll play it and play it. But personally, I don't think it's much good." PC Format's Richard Longhurst praised its "incredible depth and detail", and called it an "immense and intense" game that was "beautifully animated". Dragon gave the game 3 out of 5 stars.

Pelit published in March 1994 issue a rather positive review (90%) from Tapio Salminen who noted that problems in game mechanics hamper the game experience and the quality of graphics may have been stressed excessively at the expense of playability but eventually the game turns out to be highly addictive and absorbing.

James V. Trunzo reviewed Pagan: Ultima VIII in White Wolf #46 (Aug., 1994), giving it a final evaluation of "Very Good" and stated that "Pagan: Ultima VIII is a major player in the computer fantasy scene. A true crossbreed, it melds arcade action and roleplaying. Whether the result can satisfy both gaming camps remains to be seen. I think the combination is a success."

In 1996, Computer Gaming World ranked it as the 20th worst game of all time, stating "A once-great RPG series reduced to the level of Mario, but with hateful, virtue-less characters." Ultima VIII was named the 60th best computer game ever by PC Gamer UK in 1997, the highest position of any game in the mainline Ultima series. The editors wrote, "Even newcomers to RPGs will be able to cope with it, but it's not for the faint hearted."

Origin told Computer Gaming World in 1994 that because of criticism of Ultima VIII, Ultima IX would go "back to the virtues that made Ultima as distinctive as it was originally".
