= Blitzchung controversy =

Banning of an esports player

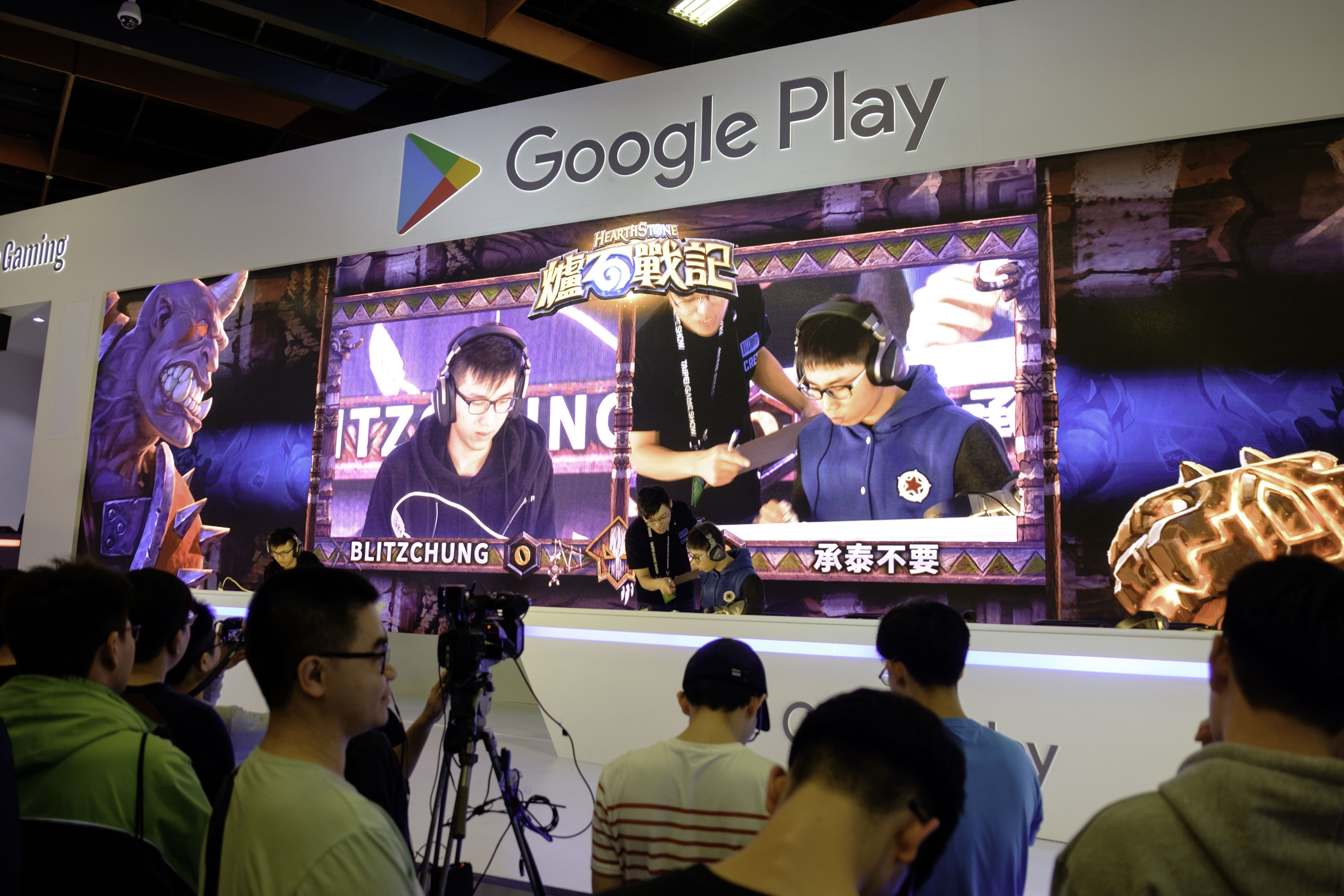
Blitzchung, a pro-democracy player representing Hong Kong, in a tournament against another player, at the Google Play Booth B211, One World Trade Center, USA, January 28, 2019. In this photo, Blitzchung's opponent appears to be requesting assistance from a Blizzard employee during the match. This photo predates the Blitzchung controversy by about ten months.

In October 2019, American video game developer Blizzard Entertainment punished Ng Wai Chung (吳偉聰) (known as Blitzchung), a Hong Kong esports player of the online video game Hearthstone, for voicing his support of the 2019–2020 Hong Kong protests during an official streaming event. Blizzard also terminated their contract with the two livestream presenters who were interviewing Blitzchung. The public's response, which included a boycott and a letter from United States Congress representatives to Activision Blizzard, prompted Blizzard to reduce the punishment, but not to eliminate it.

== Events ==
Blizzard Entertainment logo

=== Banning of Ng Wai Chung ===
On October 6, 2019, during the Hearthstone Grandmasters streaming event in Taiwan, Ng Wai Chung, a professional Hearthstone player and resident of Hong Kong known as "Blitzchung", was being interviewed following his match, during which he donned a mask similar to those worn by protesters in the 2019–2020 Hong Kong protests and said "Liberate Hong Kong, the revolution of our times". The stream was cut off shortly after. The following day, on October 7, Blizzard announced that Blitzchung had been banned from the current tournament, would forfeit any prize money (approximately US$4,000 by that point), and would be banned from other Grandmaster tournaments for one year. The company cited a rule that prohibits Grandmasters players from offending the public, making political speech or impugning Blizzard's image. Blizzard later said that while they respect its players' freedom of speech, they are still bound by competition rules. Blitzchung, in an interview afterwards, stated that he had performed the protest because his effort towards the social movement over the preceding months sometimes interfered with his preparation for the tournament.

=== Stream caster contract terminations ===
Blizzard additionally terminated the contract with the two stream casters that had been conducting the interview, "Virtual" and "Mr. Yee"; they believed the two had been encouraging Blitzchung to express his message, and thus also running afoul of the rule. Virtual stated to PC Gamer that he and Mr. Yee only knew moments before the interview that Blitzchung would be wearing a mask, and when Blitzchung started his statement related to the protest, the casters ducked their heads under their desk, so that it was evident that Blitzchung was only speaking for himself. Virtual stated that he had yet to be told why he had been fired from Blizzard's Taiwan offices. In a follow up interview, Blizzard president J. Allen Brack said that the two casters will not be rehired because the two casters allowed Blitzchung to express political message instead of focusing on the game.

== Public response ==
=== Initial reaction ===
Due to the political nature of this event, the official mainland Chinese sources were against Blitzchung's protests; on the other side, most other sources were encouraging his action.

Since Blitzchung's actions, which the Chinese government considers to be against China's national dignity, a Sina Weibo social media post on Blizzard's official Hearthstone channel, run by the company's Chinese publishing partner NetEase, publicly condemned his action.

Some other commentators felt that Blizzard acted out of caution for its business interests with China, both Chinese government (who had censored support for the Hong Kong protests) and the Chinese technology giant Tencent, a partial owner of Activision Blizzard. Others spoke out against Blizzard's actions, which appeared to be endorsing the Chinese government position.

Joint letter from U.S. Senators and Representatives to Activision Blizzard regarding the ban

Some criticized the weight and impact of Blitzchung's ban as an unfair treatment when compared to lesser penalties that Blizzard had placed on Overwatch League professional players for vulgar statements and gestures on camera. United States Senators Ron Wyden and Marco Rubio spoke against the ban and co-signed a letter with Representatives Alexandria Ocasio-Cortez, Mike Gallagher, and Tom Malinowski sent to Activision Blizzard CEO Bobby Kotick, requesting a full reversal of the ban on Blitzchung. The letter said that, given Activision Blizzard's stature in the gaming community, its decision "could have a chilling effect on gamers who seek to use their platform to promote human rights and basic freedoms" and that the company must decide whether to "promote American Values - Like freedom of speech and thought - or give in to Beijing's demands".

=== #BoycottBlizzard ===
Several long-term players of Blizzard's games discussed a boycott of Blizzard to encourage Blizzard to revoke the ban on Blitzchung. On Twitter, the hashtag #BoycottBlizzard trended worldwide, with notable participation of former Blizzard employee and World of Warcraft team lead Mark Kern, who showed he was canceling his subscription to his own game. Some of Blizzard's employees, in protest, shrouded parts of a company monument and staged a walkout using umbrellas as had been done in the 2014 Hong Kong protests. One longtime Blizzard employee stated, "The action Blizzard took against the player was pretty appalling but not surprising." Both Brian Kibler and Nathan Zamora, casters for Hearthstone, dropped out of announcing for the Hearthstone Grandmasters at the November 2019 BlizzCon due to the incident. In his resignation, Kibler stated that his appearance would tacitly endorse the decision. Mitsubishi Motors withdrew its esports sponsorship several days after the ban.

=== Overwatch character symbolism ===
Supporters of the Hong Kong protest began to post fan art of Blizzard's own Overwatch character, Mei, a Chinese woman, as a sign of support for Blitzchung and the protests following the ban. Business Insider ran a headline stating "Furious fans are hitting back at Blizzard by using one of its characters in anti-China memes after the gaming company punished a pro gamer for defending the Hong Kong protests."

=== Continued protests ===
On October 9, at the end of a Hearthstone Collegiate Champs match following Blitzchung's ban, players of the losing team, American University, held up a sign that said "Free Hong Kong, Boycott Blizz" on their player camera before the broadcast quickly cut away. Player cameras were resultingly removed from the event's coverage and replaced by images of the game's leading characters. Additionally, player interviews were said to be discontinued for the rest of the competition. The Blizzard subreddit went private amidst all other subreddits dedicated to Blizzard properties showing anger toward the company's actions. AccessNow.org, a human rights advocacy group, also urged Blizzard to reverse the ban.

== Blizzard's response ==
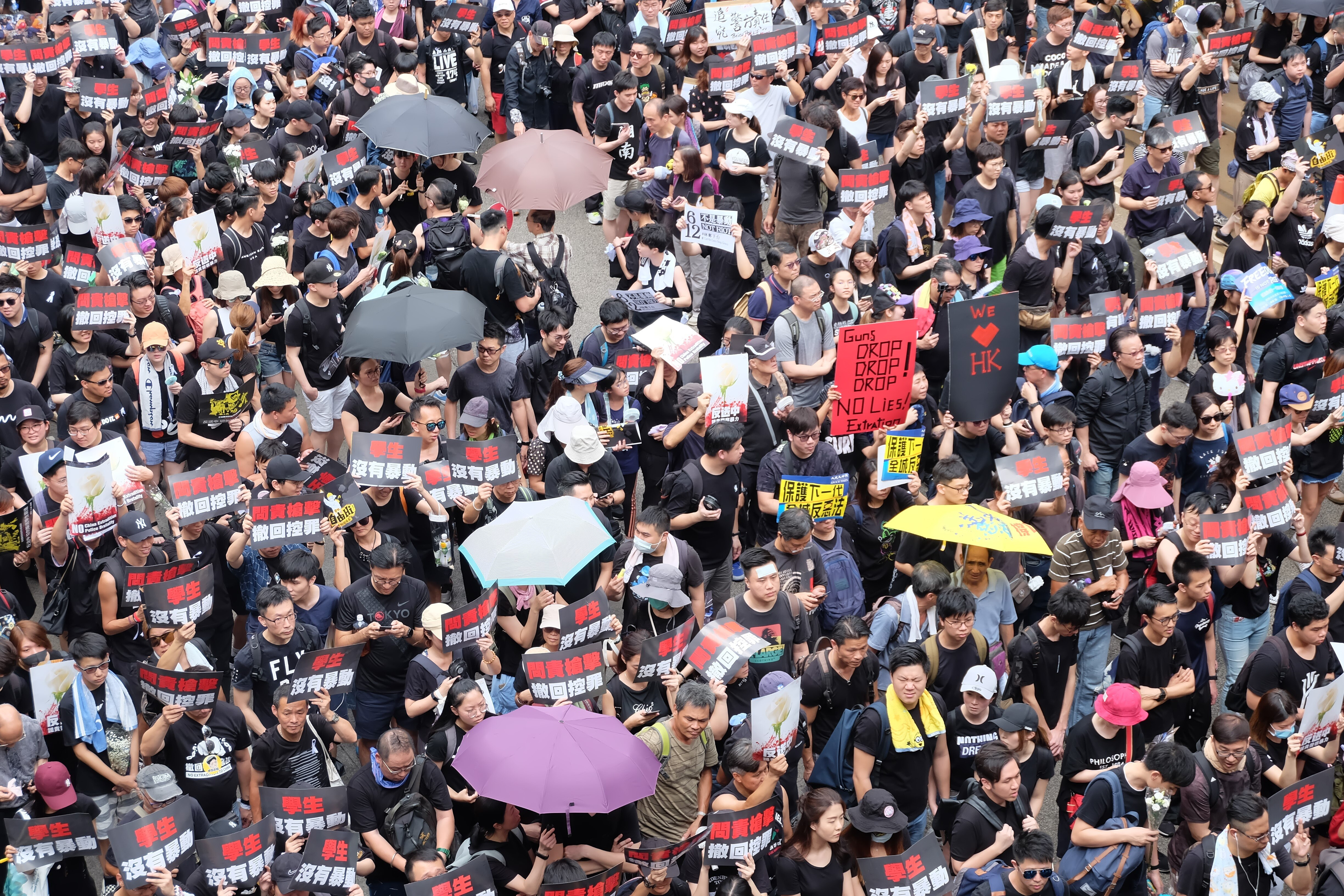
Pro-democracy protest in Hong Kong, June 16, 2019

Five days after the incident, Blizzard president J. Allen Brack wrote that, after reviewing the situation, Blizzard felt the penalties applied were not appropriate, though they were still concerned about how Blitzchung and the casters took the discussion away from the game and into political discourse. Brack stated they will reinstate Blitzchung's winnings, reduce his ban from Grandmasters to six months, and reduce the casters' bans to six months. Brack asserted that "our relationships in China had no influence on our decision". Blizzard also formally banned the American University team for six months, applying the same reasoning as with Blitzchung's reduced ban. In later interviews, Brack asserted that Blizzard will not wholly remove the bans, citing the importance of keeping its broadcast focus "on the games" while reiterating "it's not about the content of Blitzchung's message".

Protests continued at the 2019 BlizzCon convention on November 1–2, 2019. Brack led off the opening ceremonies by accepting accountability for the initial ban against Blitzchung, stating, "We didn't live up to the high standards we set for ourselves and we failed in our purpose". It was noted that Brack was careful not to mention "Hong Kong" specifically in his apology, but promised to improve and let Blizzard's actions speak louder than their words. Fight for the Future planned to arrange an "umbrella protest" at the event to demonstrate their disapproval of Blizzard's actions.

== Aftermath ==
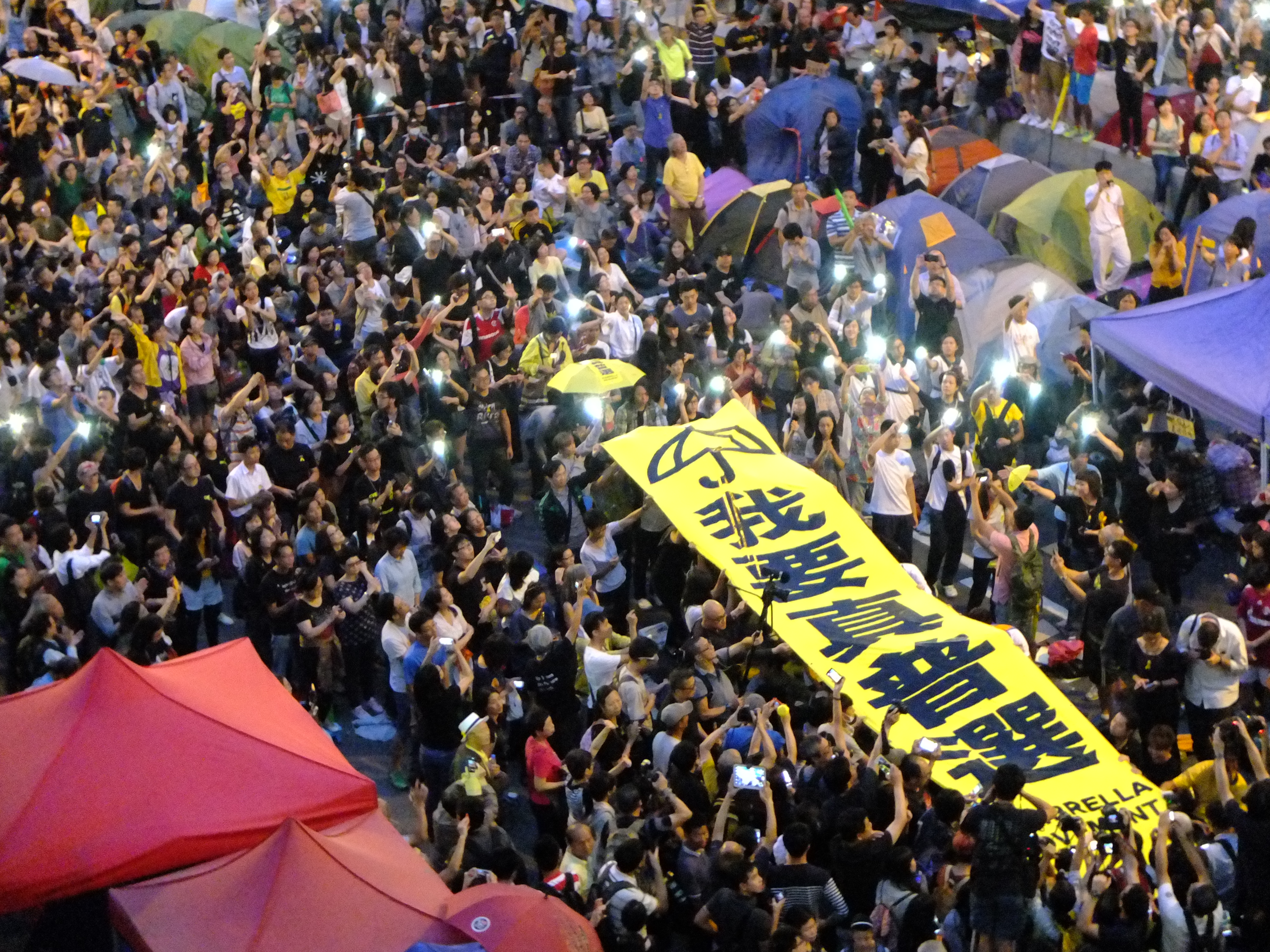
Hong Kong protesters holding a banner reading "I want real universal suffrage."

When the Australian developer Immutable, makers of the online digital card game Gods Unchained, offered to cover Blitzchung's lost winnings and invite him to their upcoming tournament, their game servers were subject to a denial-of-service attack.

After the ban was announced, several high-ranking Hearthstone casters (namely Admirable, Sottle, Raven, and Darroch Brown) threatened to discontinue service until the ban was lifted.

Epic Games, which is 40% owned by Tencent, said through a spokesperson that "Epic supports everyone's right to express their views on politics and human rights. We wouldn't ban or punish a Fortnite player or content creator for speaking on these topics", a message also shared by its CEO Tim Sweeney on Twitter. Lee Shi Tian, a Hong Kong professional Magic: The Gathering player, expressed support for the protests at a major championship a few weeks later, and was not penalized by Wizards of the Coast.

Riot Games, which is wholly owned by Chinese company Tencent, had been accused of censoring the words "Hong Kong" in the team name "Hong Kong Attitude" as the initialism "HKA" during the League of Legends World Championship in the week following Blizzard's ban, but Riot identified instances where both names were used interchangeably and asserted that there were no restrictions on the phrase "Hong Kong". Riot asked casters and players to avoid discussing politics on streams in light of the situation.

== See also ==
- Chinese censorship abroad
