= Tangled Tales: The Misadventures of a Wizard's Apprentice =

1989 video game

Tangled Tales: The Misadventures of a Wizard’s Apprentice
- Developer: Origin Systems
- Publisher: Origin Systems
- Producer: Dallas Snell
- Designers: Gary Scott Smith; Alex Duong Nghiem
- Programmer: Gary Scott Smith
- Artists: Glen Johnson; Daniel Bourbonnais
- Platforms: Apple II, Commodore 64, MS-DOS
- Release: 1989
- Genres: Role-playing, adventure
- Mode: Single-player

Tangled Tales: The Misadventures of a Wizard's Apprentice is a computer game developed by Origin Systems in 1989 for the Apple II, MS-DOS, and Commodore 64.

== Gameplay ==
The screen is divided into several areas: One displays the player's view of the world, one shows a bird's-eye view of the player's position, one contains the function icons, and one is a small text-information area. The player can select a function to move, talk, cast a spell, get or drop an item, and so on.

== Plot ==
Tangled Tales: The Misadventures of a Wizard’s Apprentice is a game in which the player is a young apprentice wizard who has no friends, spells, or money, and is preparing to go learn the trade of a wizard. The player is given a quest to complete in each new scenario, during the course of which solves various puzzles, adds new party members, and learns new spells. Characters, plots and tropes encountered in the game are derived from various mythological and fictional universes, such as a werewolf, a surfer, a snowman, Goldilocks, and Isaac Newton. The game consists of three separate scenarios, each of which must be completed before moving to the next one, but the player is able to revisit an old area if something was missed.

== Reception ==
The game was reviewed in 1991 in Dragon #166 by Patricia and Steve Sheets in "The Role of Computers" column. The reviewers gave the game 4 out of 5 stars. Compute! stated that Tangled Tales was a good introductory game for those new to adventures. Scorpia of Computer Gaming World gave the game a mixed review, saying, "it appears to be an attempt to integrate adventure game elements with role-playing elements, and this attempt is not entirely successful." The review also noted puzzles were solved primarily by having the right person in the party, "which reduces the main character to spectator at many critical points in the game."

Tangled Tales was perhaps more noted for its controversial copy protection scheme, which involved saving games to the original disk on Track 0. Reviewers complained that it would cause the heads on the Apple Disk II and Commodore 1541 to bang against the drive stop and throw them out of alignment and that it was advisable to back the original game disks as quickly as possible and avoid using them.
