= Andrew Sega =

American musician

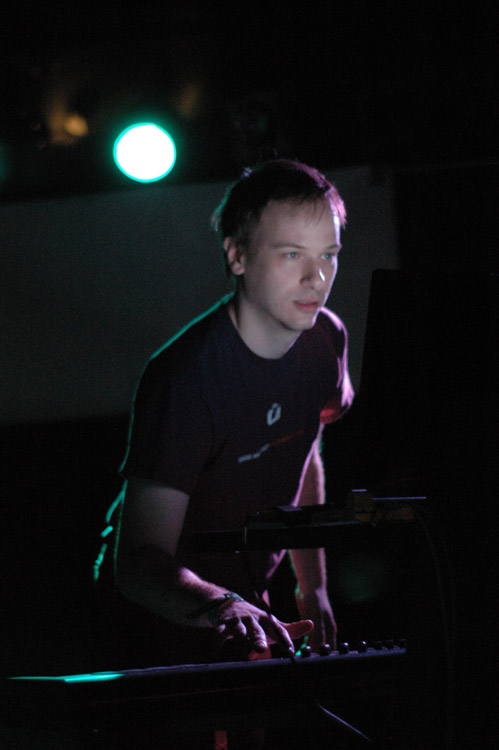
- Andrew Sega with Iris, Seattle 2008

Background information
- Also known as: Necros, Sorcen, The Alpha Conspiracy, XYZZY
- Born: Andrew Gregory Sega; May 20, 1975 (age 51); Providence, Rhode Island
- Genres: Electronica, electropop, ambient, electronic rock, IDM, indietronica, synthpop, dark wave
- Occupations: Composer, musician, software engineer, game designer
- Instruments: Keyboards, guitar, bass guitar, bass clarinet, vocals
- Years active: 1993–present
- Label: Diffusion Records
- Member of: Hallowed Hearts
- Formerly of: Iris; Straylight Productions; Stromkern; Hellven; Kosmic Free Music Foundation; Psychic Monks; Five Musicians; Low Technicians; CTRL; The Mighty Chouffe
- Website: alphaconspiracy.com

Andrew Gregory Sega (/ˈsiːɡə/ SEE-gə; born May 20, 1975), also known as Necros, is an American musician best known for tracking modules in the 1990s demoscene as well as for composing music for several well-known video games. He was a member of the synthpop duo Iris from 2001 until its disbandment in 2021. In 2020, he founded the dark wave duo Hallowed Hearts.

Sega is the owner of the independent record label Diffusion Records. His main solo project is known as The Alpha Conspiracy.

== Biography ==
Andrew Sega was born on May 20, 1975, in Providence, Rhode Island and lived the majority of his young life in Upstate New York. His interest in music began when he was 7 years old, when he started playing and experimenting with an electronic organ he had in his house. He later started taking lessons with an organist from a Polish church in Rome, New York, where he learned almost exclusively baroque music. Later in high school he learned to play other instruments, including bass clarinet and piano.

Sega's first records were from artists such as Men at Work, Genesis, and Fleetwood Mac. He discovered trackers in his first year of college (1993) from a friend who showed him Future Crew's Unreal demo. Sega was amazed with how good the music sounded. He eventually discovered FastTracker 1.0, and began writing MOD music for the first time. His first demo group was Psychic Monks. Through the mid-1990s he contributed music to various demo and music groups, and music disks such as Epidemic (1994), featuring other noted tracker musicians like Purple Motion and Skaven.

Sega later helped form the legendary tracking group Five Musicians, which featured other notable figures, such as Jeroen Tel, Basehead and Hunz. He was also a member of German demogroup Legend Design, and iCE. Sega programmed and/or composed music for several demoscene productions, such as the demo party NAID '95 demo Eden and 1996 demo Babylon. His composition, "Ascent of the Cloud Eagle", won the first place at NAID '95. In a 1998 interview, Sega declared that he had composed around four hundred finished songs.

He gradually left the demoscene behind and started making music for video games, beginning with little known titles such as In Pursuit of Greed, Ironseed and Xixit, then moving on to Origin Systems' Crusader series, where he worked as a software engineer and composer. Sega was a founding member of the video game music production company Straylight Productions, contributing tracks to the first-person shooters Unreal and Unreal Tournament. Later, he joined Digital Anvil (now a part of Microsoft Game Studios), and worked as a programmer and musician on Freelancer. In 2006 he founded Diffusion Games, a gaming company which focuses on exploring emotional and social aspects of interactivity.

In 2001, Sega founded The Alpha Conspiracy, and released two studio albums, Cipher (2001) and Aura (2004), and a split EP with Low Technicians, Forward Rewinding (2002). He also founded Diffusion Records, an independent record label through which he released The Alpha Conspiracy debut album. Gradually, Diffusion Records became a full-featured label, releasing albums by Iris, CTRL, Low Technicians, and Kilowatts and Vanek.

Sega was introduced to Iris in 2001. He started working on several test tracks with Reagan Jones before becoming an official member in 2002.

Sega is also a live member of industrial hip hop group Stromkern. As of 2011, he was working on a dark electropop side-project with Julia Beyer (Chandeen, Technoir). In 2012 Sega and Dan Clark from Stromkern teamed up under the name The Mighty Chouffe and released an EP, The West Town. In 2013 he released Obelus, the debut album from his new side-project XYZZY. In 2020, Sega and Alex Virlios (Blue Images, CTRL, Exit) formed Hallowed Hearts and released their debut album Into the Fire.

Sega's influences include Underworld, μ-Ziq, Aphex Twin, Radiohead, Orbital, Fluke, The Prodigy, Hybrid, Mouse on Mars, Depeche Mode, Rush, Genesis, XTC, Public Enemy, Imogen Heap, and The Chemical Brothers, among others. He has described alternative rock, folk, techno, ambient, jazz, and synthpop as his favorite genres, but has noted that he tries to avoid the categorization of music.

Sega studied computer science and philosophy at Stony Brook University. Throughout the years, he has worked primarily as a full-time software engineer for video games.

== Video game credits ==
Andrew Sega has composed music for the following video games:

- 1994 – Ironseed
- 1995 – Xixit
- 1995 – In Pursuit of Greed
- 1995 – Crusader: No Remorse
- 1996 – Crusader: No Regret
- 1997 – Wing Commander: Prophecy
- 1998 – Unreal
- 1999 – Jazz Jackrabbit 3 (unreleased)
- 1999 – Unreal Tournament
- 2001 – Conquest: Frontier Wars
- 2003 – Freelancer
- 2007 – Enigma
- 2007 – Aqua Teen Hunger Force Zombie Ninja Pro-Am

== Discography ==
=== Necros ===
- 1994 – Digital Psychosis (Psychic Monks, DOS music disk)
- 1995 – Progression (Five Musicians, DOS music disk with S3M files)
- 1997 – System (IT music files)

=== The Alpha Conspiracy ===
- 2001 – Cipher
- 2001 – Forward Rewinding (a split EP with Low Technicians)
- 2004 – Aura

=== Iris ===
- 2003 – Awakening
- 2003 – Reconnect
- 2005 – Wrath
- 2005 – Disconnect 2.0
- 2008 – Hydra
- 2010 – Blacklight
- 2014 – Radiant
- 2019 – Six

=== The Mighty Chouffe ===
- 2012 – The West Town (EP)

=== XYZZY ===
- 2013 – Obelus
- 2023 – Lumia

=== Hallowed Hearts ===
- 2020 – Into the Fire
- 2021 – Ruins (EP)
- 2024 – Masquerade
