= Alex Brandon =

Alex Brandon may refer to:

- Alexander Brandon, American musician
- Alex Brandon (photographer), American photojournalist
