= Alexander Brandon =

American musician (born 1974)

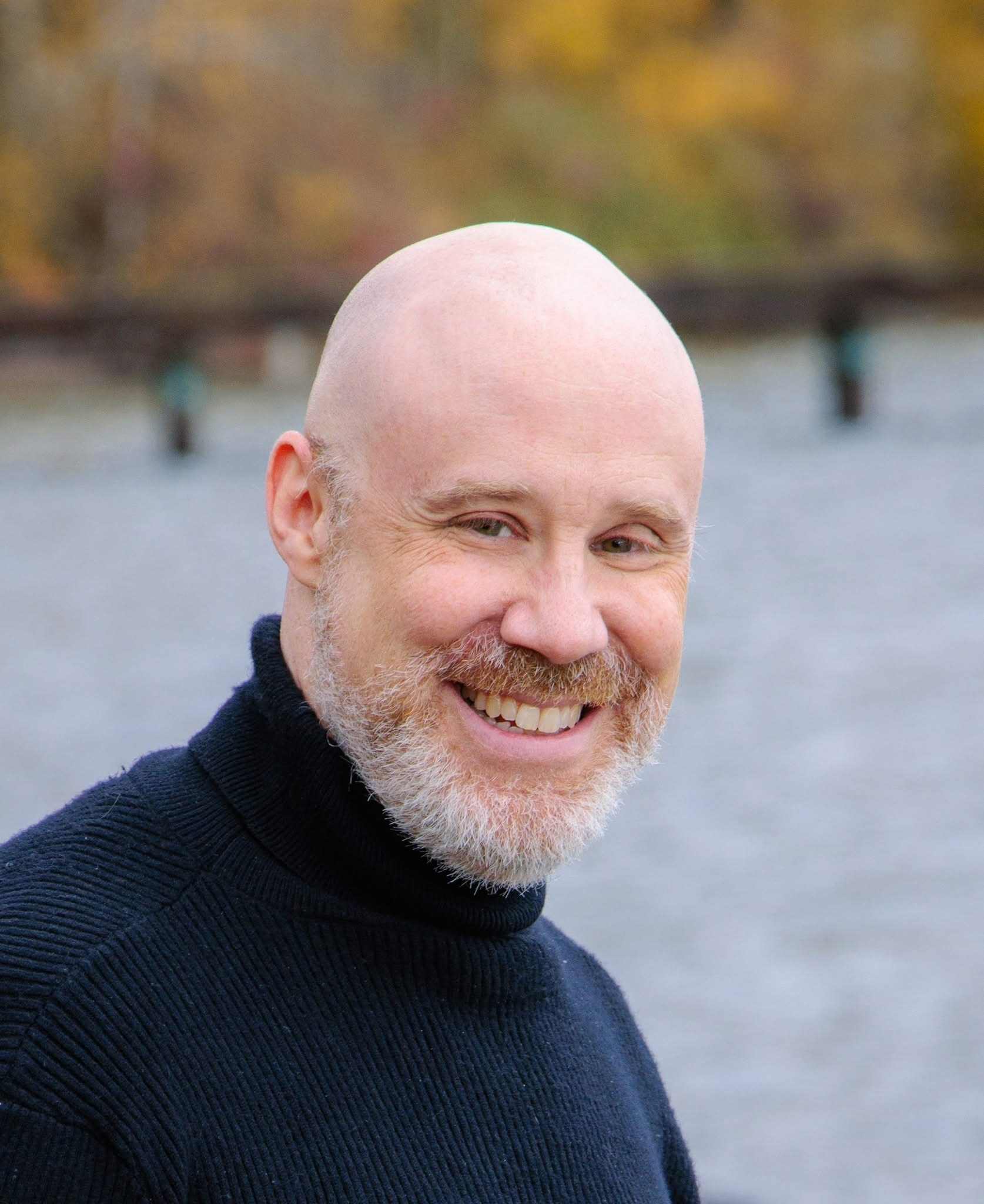
- Alexander Brandon in Seattle, Washington in 2025

Background information
- Also known as: Siren, Chromatic Dragon, Sandman
- Born: Alexander Brandon; September 29, 1974 (age 51)
- Genres: Electronica, synthpop, pop rock
- Occupations: Composer, musician, voice actor, voice director, sound designer, audio director
- Instruments: Keyboards, PC, guitar
- Years active: 1987–present
- Labels: Materia Collective, Funky Rustic Records

Alexander Brandon (also known as Siren in the demoscene and tracker community) is an American musician, former member of Straylight Productions, who composed music mostly for games produced by Epic Games, or games based on Epic technology, including Unreal, Unreal Tournament, Deus Ex, Tyrian, Jazz Jackrabbit 2, and the cancelled game Jazz Jackrabbit 3D. Brandon is also a voice actor, having been cast most recently for the parts of Ancano and Amaund Motierre in The Elder Scrolls V: Skyrim by Bethesda Game Studios.

Brandon started composing music at the age of 14 when he got an Ad Lib music synthesizer card for Christmas. He worked in several MOD music groups over his composing years in the late 1990s, including the Kosmic Free Music Foundation. During that time, he also composed for several musicdisks such as Return to Stage 9.

Brandon has built several audio departments, starting with Ion Storm Austin in mid-2000. This was followed with an audio director position at Midway Home Entertainment in San Diego until 2007 when he started the audio department at Obsidian Entertainment. In February 2009, he built the audio department at Heatwave Interactive, also providing business development and overall media management. In April 2010, Alex launched Funky Rustic, an independent audio production studio, working out of Georgetown, Texas.

== Past nicknames ==
During his tracker career, Alex has used several nicknames:

- 1995: first tracks released under the name "Chromatic Dragon"
- end of 1995: name changed to "Siren"
- middle of 1996, during KFMF membership: name temporarily changed to "Sandman"
- end of 1996: name changed back to "Siren"

Note that there were several (two or three) tracker musicians around the world, who have used the nickname "Sandman" independently of Alex.

== Influences ==
Alexander Brandon's influences include Peter Gabriel, Dream Theater, Frost*, Andrew Sega, Steve Vai, and Ozric Tentacles, among others.

== Personal life ==
Brandon lives in Seattle, Washington.

== Works ==
=== Video games ===
Year	Title	Role(s)	Notes	
1995	Tyrian	Composer, level designer, writing, story, dialogue	With Andres Molnar	
1995	Extreme Pinball	Sound effects		
1998	Jazz Jackrabbit 2	Composer	With Sean Hiller and Bryan Rudge	
1998	Unreal	Composer	With Michiel van den Bos, Dan Gardopée and Andrew Sega	
1999	Unreal Tournament	Composer	With Michiel van den Bos, Dan Gardopée and Andrew Sega	
1999	Tyrian 2000	Project leader, writing, dialogue, story, composer		
1999	Dark Vengeance	Composer	With Andrew Schlesinger, Mark Styles	
1999	Vigilante 8	Composer	Nintendo 64 version, with Dan Gardopée	
2000	Vigilante 8: 2nd Offense	Composer	Nintendo 64 version, with Dan Gardopée	
2000	Deus Ex	Composer	With Michiel van den Bos and Dan Gardopée	
2003	Unreal II: The Awakening	Composer	With Jack Wall, Clint Bajakian, Jeremy Soule and Crispin Hands	
2003	Battlestar Galactica	Composer		
2003	Deus Ex: Invisible War	Audio Director, sound effects, music		
2003	Activision Anthology	Composer		
2004	Thief: Deadly Shadows	Cinematic post sound effects, special thanks		
2005	NARC	Audio manager		
2005	Gauntlet: Seven Sorrows	Audio Director, music, sound effects	With Inon Zur, Rednote Audio and Alistair Cooper	
2006	Rampage: Total Destruction	Audio engineer		
2006	MLB Slugfest 2006	Dialogue recording		
2006	Spy Hunter: Nowhere to Run	Audio director		
2006	Happy Feet	Audio director		
2006	The Grim Adventures of Billy & Mandy	Audio director		
2007	TouchMaster	Audio director		
2007	Neverwinter Nights 2: Mask of the Betrayer	Audio director		
2007	Aqua Teen Hunger Force: Zombie Ninja Pro-Am	Audio director		Special thanks
2008	Neverwinter Nights 2: Storm of Zehir	Audio director		
2010	Bejeweled 3	Composer		With Peter Hajba and Allister Brimble
2010	Alpha Protocol	Additional Sound Effects & Foley		
2011	Bejeweled: Classic	Audio		
2011	Deus Ex: Human Revolution	Composer	With Michael McCann and Yohann Boudreault	
2012	Dust: An Elysian Tail	Composer	With HyperDuck SoundWorks	
2013	Teenage Mutant Ninja Turtles	Sound effects		
2013	Leisure Suit Larry: Reloaded	Sound effects		
2013	Aliens: Colonial Marines	Additional sound design		
2014	Wasteland 2	Sound design		
2014	Donkey Kong Country: Tropical Freeze	Contract audio		
2016	Job Simulator: The 2050 Archives	Audio		
2017	Torment: Tides of Numenera	Audio director, sound design and implementation		
2017	Aven Colony	Composer		
2018	Cloney: A Tapped Out Adventure	Composer		
2018	The Bard's Tale IV: Barrows Deep	Sound Design/Audio Consultant		
2020	Wasteland 3	Audio Director, voice acting, additional music		
Unreleased	Dead Matter			
Cancelled	Jazz Jackrabbit 3	Composer		
2024	Stormgate	Audio Director / Composer		

=== Other work ===
Year	Title	Notes
1999	AtmosphereS: Cultures	With Dan Gardopée
1999	AtmosphereS: Moods	With Dan Gardopée
1999	AtmosphereS: Pulses	With Dan Gardopée
1999	audiophonik - music for the scene generation	With various others
2000	AtmosphereS: Dreams	With George "The Fat Man" Sanger
2000	AtmosphereS: Rhythms	With George "The Fat Man" Sanger
2008	Era's End	With Bryan Rudge
2010	Earthscape	
2011	Violet Eclectic	
2011	Songs for the Cure '11: Esuna	With various others
2011	Impostor Nostalgia	With various others
2013	Nukem: Duke 3D Remixes	With various others
2013	Deus Ex: Sonic Augmentation	With various others
2013	Spectrum of Mana	With various others
2014	The Glory Days Remixed	With various others
2014	Just Fun	
2014	Just Fun Miami	
2014	The Ad Lib Collection	
2016	Sound Waves: A Tribute to Ecco the Dolphin	With various others.
2016	Chronicles of Time: A Chrono Trigger Arrangement Project	With various others.
2018	Just Fun Custom	
2019	The Belmont Adventure	With various others
2020	Conspiravision: Deus Ex Remixed	With Michiel van den Bos
2023	Omegaforce	
2025	Tournament Rematch: Unreal Tournament Remixed	With various others

=== Voice acting ===
Title	Role(s)
Deus Ex: Invisible War	Generic Citizen, Tracer Tong
Thief: Deadly Shadows	Keepers
Gauntlet: Seven Sorrows	The Emperor
L. A. Rush	Additional voices
Mortal Kombat: Armageddon	Dairou
Stranglehold	Kwong Fang
Wizard101	Mr. SollyFlood, Tarley, Tarrak Hadfield, Dog Tracy, The Valet/The Manticore, Krokodile Dundara, Freddie Kroaker, Judge Nelson, Mr. Cane, Vinnie Vicegrip
The Elder Scrolls V: Skyrim	Ancano, Amaund Motierre
DC Universe Online	Black Lightning, Black Adam, General Zod, Major Force, Cyborg
SOL: Exodus	The Commander
Pirate101	Optimus Caerulus, Danny Ratso, Kane, Meowiarty, Charon, Hawkrates
Vacation Simulator	Additional voices
Pagan Online	Dabog
Wasteland 3	Additional voices

== Books ==
- Brandon, Alexander (2004). Audio for Games: Planning, Process, and Production. New Riders. ISBN 978-0-7357-1413-7.
