= Bean bag (disambiguation) =

Bean bag is a bag containing beans.

Bean bag may also refer to:

- Bean bag chair, a type of chair
- Bean bag round, a type of less-lethal projectile
- "Bean Bag" (instrumental), an instrumental tune by Herb Alpert and the theme song to It's a Knockout
- Bean Bags, an album by Coleman Hawkins and Milt Jackson
- Beanbag (band), a Christian rock music group

== See also ==
- Beanball, a colloquial sports term for a ball thrown at an opposing player with the intention of striking him
