= Crusader: No Remorse =

1995 video game

- Developers: Origin Systems; Realtime Associates (console versions)
- Publisher: Electronic Arts
- Director: Tony Zurovec
- Producer: Warren Spector
- Designer: Mark Vittek
- Programmer: Tony Zurovec
- Artist: Beverly Garland
- Writers: Lisa Smith; Mark Vittek
- Composers: Dan Gardopée; Andrew Sega
- Engine: Enhanced Ultima VIII: Pagan engine
- Platforms: MS-DOS, PlayStation, Sega Saturn
- Release: MS-DOS: NA: September 1995; EU: 1995; PlayStation, Saturn: NA: December 24, 1996; EU: March 14, 1997
- Genre: Third-Person Shooter
- Mode: Single-player

Crusader: No Remorse is an action game developed by Origin Systems and published by Electronic Arts. It was first released in 1995 for MS-DOS, with the Sony PlayStation and Sega Saturn ports following in 1997. Set in a dystopian future 22nd century, the game centers on The Captain, a special ops officer and supersoldier, who defects from the tyrannical world government, the World Economic Consortium (WEC), and joins the Resistance rebels.

Critically well-received, No Remorse was followed by the PC-only sequel Crusader: No Regret in 1996.

== Gameplay ==
The Silencer is shooting a non-combatant with two guards and a robot present.

Crusader is divided into missions, each with their own locations and objectives. Settings vary from factories to military bases to offices to space stations, and contain a variety of enemy soldiers and servomechs, traps, puzzles and non-combatants (who can be killed with no penalty and their bodies can be looted for credits). All locations have alarm systems which are triggered by walking into view of security cameras or destroying a secured door, and can be deactivated by using an alarm box. So long as the alarm is active, either a new enemy soldier will teleport into the area every few seconds or a confined servomech will be released, depending on where the player is. In addition, the player cannot use keycard slots or door switches while an alarm is active. In the PC version, the Silencer can carry no more than five firearms at once.

The game featured an unprecedented level of setting interaction. Most of the environment can be destroyed by weapons fire and some traps or defenses can be manipulated for use against the enemy. The geography of the setting encourages the use of tactics and combinations of moves in order to hit the targets effectively with the minimum possible loss of resources. No Regret added a handful of new maneuvers to the original game, including the ability to dive forward, and to sidestep while crouching. Weapons, ammunition, credits (money), healing facilities, and other equipment are scattered through the levels, allowing the player to upgrade their arsenal.

== Plot ==
Due to economic downfalls, the nations of the planet Earth began gradually to organize themselves into huge economic super-conglomerates. Eventually, these continental organizations merged into the World Economic Consortium. The WEC is a tyrannical entity, on paper an economic allegiance, but in practice a type of "New World Order" dictatorship. While the world is made to look peaceful and prosperous, the reality is that most liberties are suspended, taxes are well over 90%, military force is used mercilessly against those who dare oppose the WEC, and freedom is barely even remembered. Only an elite upper class of WEC executives have true power and wealth; among these are WEC President Gauthier and Chairman Nathaniel Draygan. The WEC is being fought by an organization calling itself the Resistance, led by former WEC colonel Quentin Maxis, promoted to general when risen to command of the group. The Resistance is a severely outnumbered and outgunned ragtag mix of disparate people: ex-WEC soldiers and employees rub elbows with political dissidents and criminals searching for pardon.

As No Remorse opens, a team of three Silencers — the WEC's commando rank — are returning from a botched mission in which they disobeyed an order to fire upon civilians who were (mistakenly) believed to be rebels. They are ambushed by a WEC mech and two of the Silencers are killed. The remaining one, a nameless captain (the player character), was able to disable the mech with a grenade. Reconsidering his options, the Silencer joins the Resistance, where, as a significant symbol of the WEC's military power and political philosophy, he is met with resentment, distrust and outright hatred. As the game progresses, the Silencer uncomplainingly undertakes dangerous missions, often with substandard equipment, and his continued success gradually earns the respect of his fellow Resistance members.

The Silencer eventually uncovers secret plans for a WEC space station, the Vigilance Platform, which can attack any location on Earth from space, meaning cities with a known Resistance presence can simply be annihilated at the leisure of the WEC. All such cities are threatened with orbital bombardment unless they surrender. Concurrently, the player's Resistance cell is betrayed from within, and almost all the non-player characters are killed. Despite these setbacks, the Silencer infiltrates the Vigilance Platform and destroys it. The traitor is also on the station, guarding the lifepods, and challenges the Silencer to a duel over the access card for the last pod. As the Vigilance Platform is exploding, the Silencer is contacted by Chairman Draygan, who swears vengeance against him.

== Development ==
Crusader: No Remorse was developed by Loose Cannon Productions, a division of Origin Systems. It was directed by Tony Zurovec, whose chief inspiration for the game was Castle Wolfenstein. The game uses an advanced version of the Ultima VIII: Pagan isometric view engine featuring full SVGA graphics. The game's audio uses a specially made engine, called Asylum Sound System, which employs MOD files rather than General MIDI, in order to provide good quality without relying on expensive hardware. Each mission and intermission level has its own track. The soundtracks for both games were composed by Andrew Sega and Dan Grandpre of the now-defunct Straylight Productions.

The game is single player only, though a cooperative multiplayer mode supporting up to four players was being included in the game up until just before its release.

The Crusader games feature full motion video (FMV) sequences with live actors; FMVs are used in cutscenes to further the story, generally through interaction with other characters. These conversations are generally one-sided, as the player character never speaks. Like many Origin games, No Remorse shipped with significant in-universe back-story material, including a fold-out propaganda poster, newspaper and guides from the WEC and the Resistance.

Crusader contains several references to Origin's Wing Commander series and is also referenced by other games. The introduction of the game shows a dating system as used in Wing Commander (a year number, followed by a decimal signifying a day). According to Wing Commander backstory, the Terran Confederation is a government that replaced the WEC and the Wing Commander Arena manual "Star*Soldier" has an advertisement for an in-game movie titled No Regret, which is portrayed in the manual as based on true events. Furthermore, an article in the newspaper added to the No Remorse box mentions SHODAN and the Citadel space station in a reference to System Shock, and the blood-soaked operating tables seen throughout certain levels are of the same model used in Bioforge, on which its main character LEX was created on. According to the game's lead designer Tony Zurovec these references are solely easter eggs and Crusader is not sharing a universe with any other game series.

Because Crusader: No Remorse was written in C++ and assembly language, a straight port to gaming consoles was not possible, meaning the code had to be rewritten from scratch for the PlayStation and Saturn versions. Since both the consoles have only 2 MB of RAM each, some aspects had to be scaled back for the conversion; the resolution was cut from 640x480 to 320x240, and the color palette was reduced. In turn, the unique features of each console were utilized to improve on the PC version in places; new music was added to use the music overlays, and the Saturn's second processor was used for background calculations. The forward roll from Crusader: No Regret was added to both console versions.

Jorg Newman, producer of both the PlayStation and Saturn versions, remarked that despite the changes, "overall I'd call this a very conservative, very direct port."

== Release ==
In June 2011 the game and its sequel was re-released by the digital distributor GOG.com with compatibility for Windows XP/7/8 and Mac OS X (10.8.6 or newer).

== Reception ==
Reception

Aggregate score
Aggregator	Score
GameRankings	73% (PlayStation); 70% (Saturn)

Review scores
Publication	Score
Edge	8/10 (PC)
Electronic Gaming Monthly	6.5/10, 4/10, 5.5/10, 4.5/10 (Saturn)
Game Informer	7.25/10 (PlayStation)
GameSpot	8.4/10 (PC); 7.1/10 (PlayStation); 7.4/10 (Saturn)
IGN	7/10 (PlayStation)
Next Generation	5/5 (PC); 4/5 (PlayStation)
PC Gamer (US)	93%
PCMag	3/4
Computer Games Magazine	4.5/5 (PC)
Arcane	7/10
Sega Saturn Magazine	68% (Saturn)
Computer Game Review	89/90/91

Crusader: No Remorse was a commercial success. According to Denis Murphy of Retro Gamer, "Tony had hoped that Crusader would sell at least 100,000 copies, yet it eventually sold well over a quarter of a million and generated a higher return on investment than any other standalone product in Origin's history."

Crusader: No Remorse was enthusiastically received by critics. GameSpot's Ron Dullin called it "so viscerally exciting that its shortcomings can be overlooked." He elaborated that while the story and full motion video cutscenes are cheesy and the controls "can send your character jumping across the screen without warning", the graphics make the "amoral" pleasures of killing innocent people and destroying harmless pieces of scenery gratifying enough for the game to feel like pure fun. A reviewer for Next Generation made the same criticisms of the cutscenes and controls, and likewise felt the game to be outstanding in spite of these flaws. He summarized that it "has all the elements it takes to be an outstanding title: an original interface, killer graphics, spectacular sound ..." Rod White of Computer Games Magazine disputed GameSpot and Next Generation's characterization of Crusader: No Remorse as a mindless "shoot everything in sight" game, pointing out that shooting certain people prevents the player from receiving helpful advice, and in some cases even makes it impossible to complete the mission. While he agreed that blowing things up in the game is satisfying, he described the game as an exciting yet thoughtful shooter with controls akin to Fade to Black, effective cinematic elements, a "deep" and "believable" storyline, and some relevant satirizing of the news media. Rating it three out of four stars, PC Magazine said that "Crusader comes across as something new and different" despite the familiar premise. While criticizing the complicated keyboard controls, the magazine concluded that it "is a well-designed game and a lot of fun".

Crusader: No Remorse was named the best action game of 1995 by Computer Gaming World and Computer Games Strategy Plus, and was a nominee for PC Gamer US's award in this category and its overall "Game of the Year" prize. In 1996, Computer Gaming World ranked it as the 38th best PC game of all time, also listing the game's UV-9 ultraviolet rifle among the 15 "best worst ways to die in computer gaming". The game won a "Golden Triad" award from Computer Game Review, and the editors wrote, "From the ashes of Ultima VIII, Origin pulls out a winner."

Most critics felt that the console ports were successful at bringing over the elements that had made the game appealing on PC, but could have been better. In particular, the controls were considered unnecessarily complicated and the animations were considered jerky and awkward. The ability to destroy virtually anything in the game, and the accompanying audio and visual effects of the explosions, were widely applauded. However, reviews for the console versions showed a wider range of opinions on how overall fun the game was. The four reviewers of Electronic Gaming Monthly all felt that while the essential gameplay is intelligent and deep, the issues with the controls and animations completely ruin the experience. By contrast, GamePro maintained that "Crusader: No Remorse's top-notch gameplay overcomes its other imperfections, delivering blistering combat and challenges that test your brains and reflexes." Next Generation was also pleased with both the conversion and how the game "uses the carnage as a pleasing supplement to the gameplay, as opposed to making it the focal point." Trent Ward and Jeff Gerstmann of GameSpot both gave more mixed reviews, but concluded that with patience the game's shortcomings can be overcome, earning an ultimately enjoyable experience. Paul Glancey gave Crusader: No Remorse one of its few completely negative reviews in Sega Saturn Magazine, insisting that the puzzle elements are mindless, the action lacks excitement, and the explosions are "unspectacular", adding up to "a combination of unimpressive blasting interspersed with very simple door-opening tests."

Andy Butcher reviewed Crusader: No Remorse for Arcane magazine, rating it a 7 out of 10 overall. Butcher comments that "Crusader is one of those rare games that gives you a real sense of satisfaction and achievement. It's not particularly deep, and neither is it going to change the face of computer roleplaying. But it is great fun, and makes a welcome change from dull dungeon bashes."

Crusader: No Remorse was named one of the top 100 CD-ROMs by PC Magazine.

== Legacy ==
A sequel, titled Crusader: No Regret, was released in 1996.

A third game in the series (with several working titles such as Crusader 3: No Escape, Crusader II and Crusader: No Mercy) was never released. Tony Zurovec of the Crusader team left Origin and joined Wing Commander creator Chris Roberts at his new company Digital Anvil and Origin refocused its efforts on Ultima Online. Preliminary storyline ideas included boarding a shuttle and making a daring assault to get back to Earth.

Rumors emerged on the film website Dark Horizons in 2001 that a Crusader film was in development. Eurogamer speculated this had something to do with Tony Zurovec's move to Digital Anvil, whose founder Chris Roberts also worked at Origin Systems and was interested in filmmaking.

In 2006, Slovak company Outsider Development tried to convince EA on porting Crusader: No Remorse to the PlayStation Portable, but their Crusader: No Pity project (which included a working prototype) was rejected despite the support from Andrew Sega.

The game also had a big influence on the Fallout development team.
