= Straylight Productions =

- Founded: 1994; 31 years ago
- Founders: Andrew Sega; Dan Gardopée

Straylight Productions was a team of video game music composers and producers, founded in 1994.

== Overview ==
The founding musicians were Andrew Sega and Dan Gardopée, joined later by Alexander Brandon. Straylight composed soundtracks for Origin Systems' Crusader series. They also worked with Epic Games, for whom music was produced for Unreal, Unreal Tournament, Tyrian, and Jazz Jackrabbit 2 (the original Jazz Jackrabbit music was by Epic's own Robert A. Allen). Their last project was the soundtrack for Ion Storm's Deus Ex. Alexander Brandon was assisted by Michiel van den Bos with some of the soundtracks, although Van den Bos was not a part of Straylight.

Andrew Sega had all but left the company before the soundtrack for Unreal was started, but as an "honorary member" of Straylight, a cleaned-up version of his "Isotoxin" piece, minus the introduction, was included in the soundtrack. Likewise, his "Mechanism Eight" piece was included in the Unreal Tournament soundtrack.

The name of Straylight Productions came from the Villa Straylight in William Gibson's Neuromancer.

== Former members ==
- Andrew Sega
- Dan Gardopée
- Alexander Brandon
- Jake Kaufman

== Productions ==
Straylight Productions has composed music for the following video games:

- Crusader: No Remorse (1995)
- Tyrian (1995)
- Crusader: No Regret (1996)
- Unreal (1998)
- Jazz Jackrabbit 2 (1998)
- Unreal Tournament (1999)
- Deus Ex (2000)
