= In Pursuit of Greed =

1995 video game

- Developer: Mind Shear Software
- Publishers: Softdisk; WizardWorks; Memorex Software
- Designers: Jeremy Stanton; Chris Tallent
- Programmer: Robert W. Morgan III
- Writer: Jeremy Stanton
- Composer: Andrew Sega
- Engine: Raven Engine
- Platform: MS-DOS
- Release: 1995
- Genre: First-person shooter
- Modes: Single-player, multiplayer

In Pursuit of Greed (also known as Assassinators) is a science fiction-themed first-person shooter video game released in 1995 for MS-DOS, It was developed by Mind Shear Software and published by Softdisk.

== Release ==
After Mind Shear Software's release of Ironseed in 1994, Softdisk Publishing reached out to them with the suggestion that they take advantage of the pre-alpha Doom code that Softdisk had access to in order to create a shooter, in the hopes of capitalizing on the popularity of Doom. This was Id's Raven engine, licensed to Raven Software for their 1993 game ShadowCaster. Mind Shear agreed enthusiastically, expecting that they would be working on a nearly complete Doom engine. Only after contracts were signed and development was underway did they discover just how buggy and incomplete the codebase was. Problems with lag, jerky animation, and slow rendering plagued the project right up until a significantly delayed release.

The game was re-released under the name Assassinators by Memorex Software in 1998.

The game and its source code were released as non-commercial freeware by the programmer around 2014.

== Reception ==
Reception of the game by press and gamers was mostly unimpressed to negative. However, some game aspects like curved surfaces, the "rear mirror" mechanic, and the colorful protagonists were positively mentioned. Also the soundtrack, done by Andrew Sega, was praised. The game was not a commercial success due to the technical problems with the unfinished engine and the competing high-profile title Duke Nukem 3D, released shortly after Greed, which led to a cool reception from the press and the public alike.

The game received a 59/100 in the PC Gamer August 1996 issue, and called it "pretty forgettable".

Old PC Gaming gave the game 2.5 stars, calling it "not a particularly irredeemable" game, but somewhat "formulaic" and "outdated".
