= Wrath (Iris album) =

Studio album by Iris
- Released: August 23, 2005
- Genre: Electronic rock, indietronica
- Length: 43:07
- Label: Diffusion Records/ Infacted Recordings / Q-Code / Vision Music
- Producer: Andrew Sega

Iris chronology
Awakening (2003)	Wrath (2005)	Hydra (2008)

Singles from Wrath
- 1. "Hell's Coming With Me / Appetite Remixes (12")" Released: 2006; 2. "It Generates" Released: 2006

Professional ratings
Review scores
Source	Rating
Amazon	4/5 stars

Wrath is the third album by electropop group Iris, released in 2005. Taking the organic style of Awakening and adding guitars, they created this album with "more of a 'rock' feel" than a "'club' feel".

== Track listing ==
All tracks are written by Reagan Jones and Andrew Sega.

No.	Title	Length
1.	"Lands of Fire"	6:01
2.	"It Generates"	6:13
3.	"Imposter"	4:00
4.	"Appetite"	4:51
5.	"Guide on Raging Stars"	5:13
6.	"68"	4:21
7.	"No One Left to Lose"	4:16
8.	"Hell's Coming With Me"	5:04
9.	"Intercede Light"	4:12
10.	"Delivered One"	5:39
Total length:		43:07

== Personnel ==
=== Iris ===
- Reagan Jones - vocals, songwriting, keyboards
- Andrew Sega - keyboards, guitars, programming, production

=== Additional personnel ===
- Chris Brickler - guitar on "68"
- Brian Pearson - guitar on "No One Left to Lose"
