= Brute Force (video game) =

2003 video game

- Developer: Digital Anvil
- Publisher: Microsoft Game Studios
- Director: Bill Baldwin
- Producer: Erin D. Roberts
- Designer: Tim Fields
- Artists: Rhett Bennatt; Scott Peterson
- Writer: John Heeder
- Composers: T. J. O'Leary; Jesper Kyd; James Hannigan
- Platform: Xbox
- Release: NA: May 27, 2003; AU: June 5, 2003; EU: June 20, 2003
- Genres: Third-person shooter Tactical shooter
- Modes: Single-player, multiplayer

Brute Force is a squad-based third-person shooter video game developed by Digital Anvil and published by Microsoft for Xbox in 2003. In the game, a team of four people fight in numerous battles, with each playable character on the team having their own strengths and weaknesses.

The story is of a science-fiction setting where humans spread throughout the galaxy and tension arises with the threat of an emerging hostile alien race. The squad, Brute Force, is sent in to confront the enemy.

Brute Force began as a PC game in 2000, but was soon after turned into a first-party title for the Xbox, following the buyout of Digital Anvil by Microsoft.

== Gameplay ==
Brute Force was developed to be a third-person squad-based shooter. This allows for both open-ended type gameplay and adding a tactical component by playing the characters according to their abilities. Engagements can be handled via stealth, sniper fire, or direct assault. Each of the four playable characters has a special ability for approaching combat in their own way. Tex and Brutus are suited to direct assaults, Hawk is suited to stealth, and Flint is suited to sniping enemies. The player switches between and issues orders to the characters via the D-pad. No online gameplay is offered with Brute Force, but there is cooperative play, where another player may at any time control another character during the campaign. Up to four players are supported this way.

After the mechanics of the squad-based gameplay, AI was perhaps the most important parts of development. This was actually to complement the team-based system, which would allow the enemies to act intelligently and allow your team to support the player and work together as a team. The gameplay has four different command modes to which the AI reacts differently. The characters are also aware of the environment in finding areas for cover and sniping, as well as going to heal themselves.

The single or multi-player campaign missions are composed mostly of a series of battles where the player/players attempts to fight their way to the end. They consist mostly of objectives such as disabling structures, eliminating a target, or collecting an artifact. These missions take place on six different planets with different environments — a desert, a swamp, a volcanic planet, and an alien lair.

The multiplayer mode is a feature consists of choosing one squad (which usually represents different human factions and alien races) and playing different game modes against other players. The different squads are unlocked as you complete the campaign (i.e. the first squad unlocked are the main characters of the game). Each squad member has a different set of weapons or ability.

== Plot ==
Brute Force takes place in the year 2340, when the human race has spread out across the galaxy and settled around 50 star systems, which are collectively known as the "Known Worlds". The major colonies and some alien races are governed by what is known as the Confederation of Allied worlds (usually referred to as the "Confed"). They patrol borders, protect their people, and keep watch on hostile alien races, as well as humans who wish to work for the aliens.

The game begins with a scene showing a sandstorm and the first character known as Tex fighting off an unknown force when suddenly a dropship he was about to board takes off without him. When he defends himself from what now looks like snakes, they overrun and kill him. His memory chip is re-obtained and he is cloned. He then gets his mission briefing from his commander on invading a small base on a planet named Estuary, occupied by former mercenary allies known as Red Hand.

After he successfully completes his mission, he is sent on another mission on a planet called Ferix where new allies to the Confederation are located. He is told to find the second member of Brute Force, a Feral alien named Brutus, who is trying to defend himself and his fellow colonists against uprising by exiled Feral outcasts. After that situation, Brutus wants to kill his clan leader who is evidently now an Outcast. The next mission has the team recover a briefcase on another planet called Caspian, but the Colonists that control the station have been mutated by exposure to toxic chemicals and transformed into Mutants. The team clears out the zone and finds the briefcase.

They are assigned to find a third member of the team named Hawk, whom Tex is surprised to find out is female. They find her on a planet called Osiris where natives known as Seers and reach their leader known as Shadoon. They find a spy who tells them information about the Outcast operation on Ferix saying that Shadoon was behind the situation. After guiding the spy, they find out that the Seers are also being helped by the Fire Hounds. They clear out everything and then return to Estuary where there are still reports of Red Hand on the planet; the team intends to destroy some computers to stop the Red Hand from transferring data to an unknown location, but the Red Hand are backed up by Mutants.

After clearing out the last of the Red Hand on Estuary, they return to Caspian to meet the last member of the team, Flint. They are tasked to track down someone known as Edward Kingman, who was funding the Red Hand. However, they must battle their way through Mutants who have slaughtered the Militia and are now guarding the Outline Perimeter for Kingman's zone. After taking out Kingman, they return to Ferix to locate a crashed Confederation ship which was shot down, then return to Osiris to destroy a spire in which the Seers are using for something unknown. They stop this, and then return to Ferix one last time to find that the Seers are on a ship to Ferix. The Confederation manage to shoot it down, but the Outcasts locate the crash site. The Seers and Outcasts team up to defend themselves against the team.

On the next mission they are tasked to find a traitorous Confed colonel named Gunther Ghent who trained with Hawk's recon unit, but is now selling weapons to the Red Hand. They then head back to Caspian to take out a Super Mutant in one last encounter with the Mutants. They return to Osiris one last time to finally kill Shadoon, who is guarded by millions of Fire Hounds, Seers, and Psionic Artillery. They find out that a Commset has crashed on a planet called Singe. The Commset is being guarded by Fire Hounds, as well as Red Hand, who are working together to guard the Commset. They are then sent to Caspian to find a Synthetic traitor named Ty Mctavish, who is identical to Flint, the team has one last battle with Kingman's associates before heading out. They are sent to an asteroid named LB-429 where Mctavish was sending unknown data to an unknown contact on the planet, they investigate and find out the asteroid is infested by a race called the Shrikes. They find their leader, a Hunter Lord. The Shrikes are now invading Caspian; later on, the team returns to Estuary one last time after so many missions not on Estuary. Now occupied by Shrikes, the team is now tasked to find some Alien Technology of unknown origin so the Confed can examine it. Then they return to LB-429 where they find the last of the Shrikes, and plan to finally destroy the Asteroid. They manage to kill the Hunter Lord and get evacuated, while several Confed jets destroy the asteroid.

After the end credits, the team is seen walking into a dazing sunlight on an unknown planet (most likely Estuary).

== Development ==
Brute Force was developed by Digital Anvil, one of Microsoft's internal developers that had previously worked on games such as Wing Commander, Strike Commander, and Starlancer. Brute Force was designed to be a first-party game for the Xbox and begun in March 2000, before the console had launched. However, development had begun before the takeover of Digital Anvil by Microsoft, and the title was originally meant for PC. Microsoft promptly turned it into an Xbox exclusive title.

Digital Anvil was known as a developer of space combat games, and with Brute Force they set out to try something new, specifically a ground-based game. They also wanted to attempt a team-oriented game that would put the player in control of a squad of characters set amid numerous environments. The game was conceived from these few core ideas. Development should also be looked at in the context of a first-party Xbox game following the enormous success of Halo. For one the game was meant to attract gamers who were fans of Halo, but also sufficiently different enough. Secondly the developers wanted the game to be a showcase of what the Xbox hardware was graphically capable of. However the team did admit that they had no idea what the system was capable of when they first started developing for it.

The core team of developers was composed of 30 people, but counting testers and other outside contributors more than 100 people had worked on the game. Only three months were spent on the concept stage of development, but would spend the next two years on the prototype cycle of development. Numerous influences on the game were cited. During the beginning of the project the developers looked toward Tom Clancy's Rainbow Six and Counter-Strike, stating that they wished to reach a level of intensity that fell somewhere between these two games. They also wished to implement a strategic element to the game, which was influenced by X-COM, where a team-based system was used to overcome obstacles. Halo also influenced the game, but according to the developers only to a minimal extent, mostly in terms of interface design and combat balancing. Some aspects were admitted to being similar to Halo for the sake of making the game accessible to those who had played Halo before (the controls are, for example, almost identical).

The game was first officially unveiled in October 2001 at Microsoft's X01, and shown in more detail later at E3 2002 and X02, where according to the developer much of the speculation was that the released media was not actually in-game. Although it was also said that the technology was one of the biggest challenges of development, and had not received final development kits until mid-2001.

Brute Force has the distinction of being the last game developed by Digital Anvil, as the studio was closed down officially on January 31, 2006. The staff was integrated in to Microsoft Game Studios in Redmond.

== Reception ==
Reception

Aggregate score
Aggregator	Score
Metacritic	77/100

Review scores
Publication	Score
AllGame	3/5
Edge	5/10
Electronic Gaming Monthly	6.67/10
Eurogamer	8/10
Famitsu	28/40
Game Informer	8.25/10
GamePro	3.5/5
GameRevolution	B−
GameSpot	7.6/10
GameSpy	3/5
GameZone	8.6/10
IGN	8.1/10
Official Xbox Magazine (US)	8/10
X-Play	3/5
The Cincinnati Enquirer	3.5/5
Entertainment Weekly	C

The game received "generally favorable reviews" according to the review aggregation website Metacritic. In Japan, where the game was ported for release on October 9, 2003, Famitsu gave it a score of 28 out of 40.

Nick Catucci of The Village Voice gave the game eight out of ten, saying, "with their waving grass and bubbling lava, Brute Force's graphics are even richer than its game-play possibilities. Those synthetics keep looking better and better." Scott Steinberg of Maxim gave it four stars out of five, saying, "True, storming enemy positions is an option, but with environments this wide-open, you'll just get your ass handed to you by a heavily armed battalion of baddies (or asshole buddies) if you do." Playboy gave it 75%, saying, "Keeping track of the entire team while under fire requires strategy, so try being more Rumsfeld and less Rambo." Marc Saltzman of The Cincinnati Enquirer gave it three-and-a-half stars out of five, saying, "there isn't an online option to let friends play over the Internet-based Xbox Live service." However, Noah Robischon of Entertainment Weekly gave it a C, saying, "So why is Brute Force such a dud? Well, the elite unit's top secret missions are as one-dimensional and repetitive as their foes. And the four commandos — two shapely women, one burly man, and a frog beast, cloned anew each time they die — utter lines that would have sounded cheesy even on a '70s cop show. Let's hope someone takes Brute Force's DNA and clones it into a better game."

While reviews were fairly positive, there were quite a few complaints concerning the gameplay, many criticisms stemming from a 2001 video that was included with many of Microsoft's first-party launch titles, in which the four characters complete a mission by using their unique skills in unison to achieve goals. The final game included very few of these instances, instead resorting to a more action-based shoot'em-up where individual traits were unessential to victory but could certainly make a level much easier. This hurt the gameplay, as the entire game was developed to be a tactical shooter. The various characters were also seen as being unbalanced, many noting Hawk to be the least useful on the team, mostly due to her low health (with the notable exception during the optional battle in Ferguson Base). GameNOW's Miguel Lopez expressed disappointment in the game, but called it "a fun, silly shooter that's best enjoyed alongside your whole crew." He ended his review: "If you're bored, go outside. If you're still bored when you get back, then rent Brute Force."

There was a large amount of hype for the game leading up to its release. It broke Xbox sales records of both first day and first week sales, beating out even Halo.
