= Dark Vengeance =

Dark Vengeance may refer to:

- Dark Vengeance (True Justice), an episode of the TV series True Justice
- Dark Vengeance (film), a 1993 action/science fiction film
- Dark Vengeance (video game), a 1998 video game by GT Interactive
