= Red Right Return (disambiguation) =

Red Right Return is an album by the band Janus.

Red Right Return or Red Right Returning also may refer to:

== Mnemonics for navigation ==
- Practice, for watercraft "returning to" (i.e., entering) a port that complies with ALCO standards for the "B" region, of steering so that red-marked navigational aids lie to the right of an observer facing forward on the vessel.
- Principal that an aircraft, whose red navigational light lies to the right of an observer's line of sight, is reducing rather than increasing their separation, along the direction of that light of sight

== Musical works ==
- Jim McGrath's Red Right Returning album (which includes "Oh Shenandoah")
- Songs:
  - "Red Right Return" on Blacklight by Iris
  - "Red.Right.Return. (Straight In Our Hands)" on Threes by Sparta
