= Cipher (The Alpha Conspiracy album) =

Studio album by The Alpha Conspiracy
- Released: 2001
- Genre: Electronica
- Length: 46:22
- Label: Diffusion
- Producer: Andrew Sega

The Alpha Conspiracy chronology
Cipher (2001)	Aura (2004)

Cipher is the debut album by The Alpha Conspiracy, released in 2001.

Splendid E-Zine's Ron Davies called the album "easily one of the best electronic releases of the past year", and later wrote, "Whereas a great deal of electronic music is best described as icy and repetitive, Sega's compositions are completely engaging."

== History ==
Andrew Sega had previously written music using music trackers like FastTracker and Impulse Tracker. At that time, he felt that it would be silly to try to release an album using Impulse Tracker's 8-bit samples and its other limited features. However, after discovering Jeskola Buzz, he felt that he could finally write songs which would sound "professional". Inspired by some of his friends who had already self-released records, Sega wrote material which would eventually become Cipher and released it using his newly established label, Diffusion Records.

"Martian Love Song" was the oldest song on the album, having been written by Sega in 1997 — with the title "martian lovesong" — as a veteran entrance for the Hornet Music Contest 5 tracking competition, where it finished second.

== Track listing ==
All tracks are written by Andrew Sega.

No.	Title	Length
1.	"Cross Product"	5:12
2.	"Martian Love Song"	4:13
3.	"Black Sunrise"	4:53
4.	"Winter"	4:01
5.	"Skeptopotamus"	3:17
6.	"Glass"	2:35
7.	"Ubik"	4:23
8.	"Morphic"	4:08
9.	"Nonsense"	4:02
10.	"Spiral Effect"	5:01
11.	"Further"	4:37
Total length:		46:22
