= Aura (The Alpha Conspiracy album) =

Studio album by The Alpha Conspiracy
- Released: 2004
- Genre: Electronica
- Length: 49:50
- Label: Diffusion Records
- Producer: Andrew Sega

The Alpha Conspiracy chronology
Cipher (2001)	Aura (2004)

Aura is the second studio album by The Alpha Conspiracy, released in 2004.

In a review for Splendid E-zine, Melissa Amos wrote:

The most remarkable aspect of Aura isn't its perfect composition, but the warmth it conveys. While so many of his programmer contemporaries construct tracks like modern building contractors -- all steel and glass and cement -- Sega's work demonstrates a sense of humanity. There's a friendliness to the album's deep textures, something more personal and inviting than we're accustomed to hearing from electronic music.

— Melissa Amos, Splendid E-zine

Andrew Sega incorporated his vocals on some of Aura's songs, a practice which he wasn't previously known for. Ned Kirby of Stromkern contributed vocals in "Accelerating".

Aura appeared at #17 in the June 2004 edition of the French Alternative Charts.

== Track listing ==
All tracks are written by Andrew Sega.

No.	Title	Length
1.	"Wishing Never"	3:44
2.	"Close"	3:36
3.	"Crush Terminology"	5:03
4.	"Defend Yourself"	4:48
5.	"Accelerating" (featuring Ned Kirby)	3:17
6.	"Awake"	5:31
7.	"72 Hours"	4:16
8.	"Waterfall"	4:26
9.	"City of Ruin"	4:53
10.	"Bip Neuro"	3:26
11.	"Rtyu"	3:04
12.	"Scarlet"	2:24
Total length:		49:50
