= Jeskola Buzz =

Audio tracker for Microsoft Windows

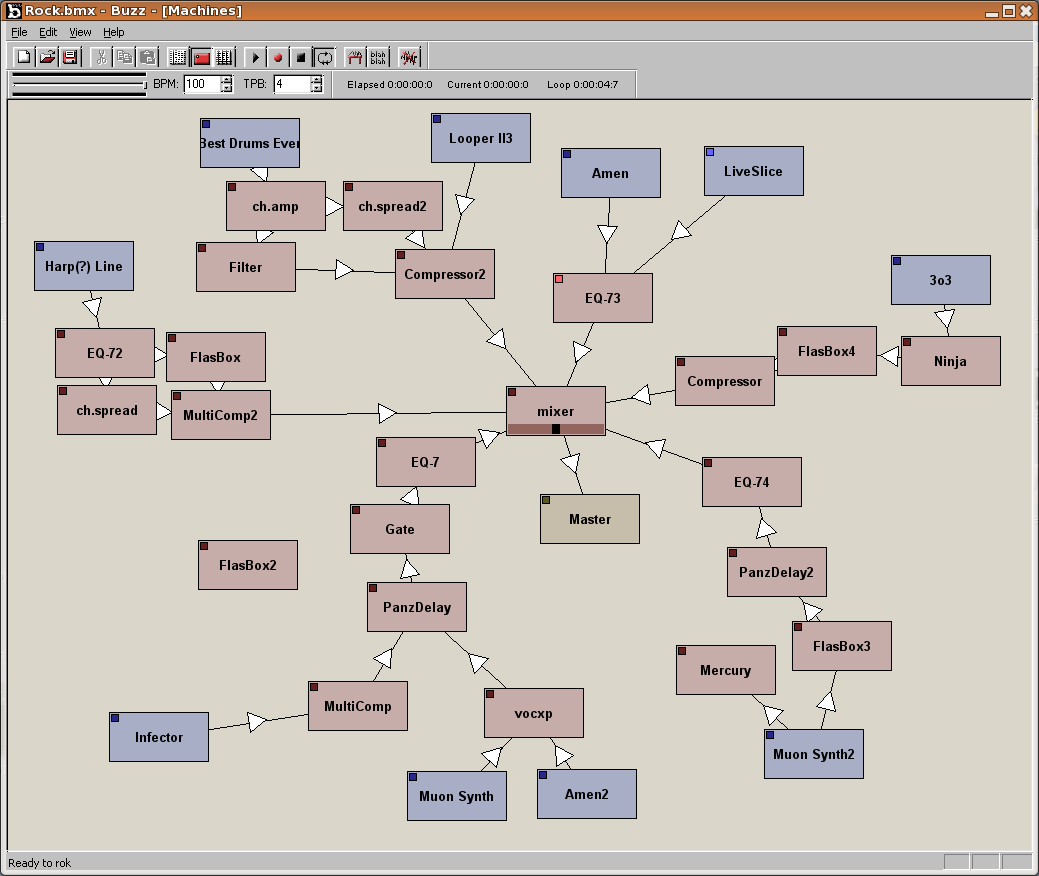
- Jeskola Buzz - Machine View Jeskola Buzz - Machine View
- Developer: Oskari Tammelin
- Stable release: Build 1503 / January 16, 2016; 10 years ago
- Operating system: Microsoft Windows
- Type: Digital music workstation
- License: Freeware
- Website: Jeskola Buzz

Jeskola Buzz is a freeware modular software music studio environment designed to run on Microsoft Windows using MFC. It is centered on a modular plugin-based machine view and a multiple pattern sequencer tracker.

Buzz consists of a plugin architecture that allows the audio to be routed from one plugin to another in many ways, similar to how cables carry an audio signal between physical pieces of hardware. All aspects of signal synthesis and manipulation are handled entirely by the plugin system. Signal synthesis is performed by "generators" such as synthesizers, noise generator functions, samplers, and trackers. The signal can then be manipulated further by "effects" such as distortions, filters, delays, and mastering plugins. Buzz also provides support through adapters to use VST/VSTi, DirectX/DXi, and DirectX Media Objects as generators and effects.

A few new classes of plugins do not fall under the normal generator and effect types. These include peer machines (signal and event automated controllers), recorders, wavetable editors, scripting engines, etc. Buzz signal output also uses a plugin system; the most practical drivers include ASIO, DirectSound, and MME. Buzz supports MIDI both internally and through several enhancements. Some MIDI features are limited or hacked together such as MIDI clock sync.

== Development ==
Buzz was created by Oskari Tammelin who named the software after his demogroup, Jeskola.

In 1997-98 Buzz was a "3rd Generation Tracker", and it has since evolved beyond the traditional tracker model.

The development of the core program, buzz.exe, was halted on October 5, 2000, when the developer lost the source code to the program. It was announced in June 2008 that development would begin again, eventually regaining much of the functionality.

Development was restarted in June 2008.

== Plugin system ==
Buzz's plugin system is intended to operate according to a free software model. The header files used to compile new plugins (known as the Buzzlib) contain a small notice that they are only to be used for making freeware plugins and Buzz file music players. The restriction requires that developers who wish to use the Buzz plugin system in their own sequencers pay a fee to the author.

== Notable users ==
Some notable electronic musicians who use Jeskola Buzz include:

- Andrew Sega
- Hunz
- Andreas Tilliander
- James Holden, whose early work was produced entirely within Buzz.
- Lackluster
- Oliver Lieb
- The Field
- Simon Viklund

== See also ==
- Buzztrax is an effort to recreate a Buzz-like environment under a free software license which runs under Linux.
- Visual programming language
