= Radiant (Iris album) =

Studio album by Iris
- Released: October 24, 2014
- Genre: Electronic rock, indietronica, electropop
- Length: 45:05
- Label: Dependent Records
- Producer: Andrew Sega

Iris chronology
Blacklight (2010)	Radiant (2014)

Radiant is the fifth studio album by the electropop band Iris, released on October 24, 2014 through Dependent Records.

== Background ==
In a 2012 interview, Andrew Sega said that while writing "Cruel Silence" from the album Blacklight, he knew it "had a non-zero chance of being the last song on the last ever Iris album." After finishing the U.S. tour for Blacklight, Reagan Jones and Sega parted ways due to a tour argument, and Iris was put on hold. There was more than a year of silence between the band members, and Sega thought that Iris would never again release another album. However, this ended when Jones sent Sega three demo songs, which would form the basis of Radiant. In 2014, Iris signed with Dependent Records.

According to Sega, "[Radiant] is the story of a man who all of a sudden sees his world within a new environment and realises how bright and radiant it can truly be, if one looks upon it with different eyes."

The album was mastered at Timeless Mastering in Brooklyn, New York using entirely analog recording.

== Track listing ==
All tracks are written by Reagan Jones and Andrew Sega.

No.	Title	Length
1.	"Another Way"	3:09
2.	"Phenom"	4:05
3.	"Wayseer"	4:13
4.	"In the Clear"	3:46
5.	"Sound Becomes Waves"	7:08
6.	"Don't Cry"	4:29
7.	"Infinite Yonder"	4:13
8.	"Cries of Insanity"	3:44
9.	"Rewired"	3:21
10.	"Sight Unseen"	3:18
11.	"Life in a Forest"	3:37
Total length:		45:05

== Personnel ==
- Reagan Jones – vocals, songwriting, keyboards
- Andrew Sega – keyboards, guitars, programming, production
