= Disconnect (Iris album) =

Studio album by Iris
- Released: March 11, 2000
- Recorded: 1994–1999
- Genre: Synth-pop
- Length: 49:10
- Label: A Different Drum (U.S.); October (Sweden); Infacted Recordings (Germany); Q-Code Records (Russia)
- Producer: Iris

Iris chronology
Disconnect	Awakening (2003)

Singles from Disconnect
- 1. "Annie, Would I Lie to You?"

Professional ratings
Review scores
Source	Rating
AllMusic	2.5/5 stars

Disconnect is the debut album by electropop group Iris, released in 2000. This album helped Iris win "Best Band" and "Best Album" awards at the American Synthpop Awards in 2000. Its single, "Annie, Would I Lie to You?" was one of the best-selling records in label A Different Drum's history.

== Track listing ==
All tracks are written by Reagan Jones and Matthew Morris, except track #10.

No.	Title	Length
1.	"Lose in Wanting" (Jones/Morris)	6:01
2.	"Saving Time" (Jones/Morris)	6:13
3.	"Endless" (Jones/Morris)	4:00
4.	"Twilight" (Jones/Morris/Marsalis/Mason)	4:51
5.	"The Way I Live My Life" (Jones/Morris)	5:13
6.	"Annie, Would I Lie To You?" (Jones/Morris)	4:21
7.	"Danger is the Shame" (Jones/Morris)	4:16
8.	"Waves Crash In" (Jones/Morris)	5:04
9.	"Loom" (Jones/Morris)	4:12
10.	"The Picture" (Hirschburger, K./Kemmler, H./Killer, M./Lohr, M.)	5:39
Total length:		49:10

== Personnel ==
- Reagan Jones - vocals, songwriting, keyboards
- Matthew Morris - keyboards, programming, production
