= Freelancer (video game) =

2003 video game

- Developer: Digital Anvil
- Publisher: Microsoft Game Studios
- Producer: Phil Wattenbarger
- Designers: Jörg Neumann; Adam Foshko; Brian Hackert; David Chang; Dustin Cryer; Jacob Crow; Will Dougherty; Eric Willmar; John Sripan; Scott Shelton; Tod D. Degani; Chris Todd; Jesse Benitez-Steiner
- Programmers: Paul Isaac; Ed Maurer; Tony Bratton
- Artist: Bruce Lemons
- Writers: Adam Foshko; Jörg Neumann
- Composers: James Hannigan; Andrew Sega
- Platform: Microsoft Windows
- Release: WW: March 4, 2003
- Genre: Space trading and combat simulator
- Modes: Single-player, multiplayer

Freelancer is a 2003 space trading and combat simulation video game developed by Digital Anvil and published by Microsoft Game Studios. It is a chronological sequel to Digital Anvil's Starlancer, a combat flight simulator released in 2000. The game was initially announced by Chris Roberts in 1999, and following many production schedule mishaps and a buyout of Digital Anvil by Microsoft, it was eventually released in March 2003.

In the game, players take on the roles of spacecraft pilots. These characters fly single-seater ships, exploring the planets and space stations of 48 known star systems. They also engage in dogfights with other pilots (player- and computer-controlled) to protect traders or engage in piracy themselves. Other player activities include bounty-hunting, commodity trading, and resource mining. The single-player mode puts the player in the role of Edison Trent, who goes through a series of missions to save the Sirius sector from a mysterious alien force. In multiplayer mode, players are free to take on any role and to explore anywhere from the start.

== Gameplay ==
Players take up the roles of pilots who fly single-seat spacecraft, trading with merchants on space stations and planets, and engaging in combat against other vessels. Starting with a small spacecraft in a star system, the player's character explores the region, opening up new systems for further adventures. Each system provides opportunities to increase the pilot's wealth; aside from taking on jobs to ferry goods and hunting for bounties, the player character can engage in trade. The player character's primary goal in the game is to accumulate money, so as to buy more advanced weaponry and equipment to upgrade his ship.

In Freelancer, the spacecraft is controlled by pointing and clicking with the mouse.

The game is played primarily through "pointing and clicking" with the mouse and a few keyboard commands. This system is also used to control the spacecraft, a breakaway from the traditional use of joysticks for space flight simulators. Observing their spacecraft from the rear, players fly their ships by moving the mouse in the direction they want the vessels to go. Freelancer's spacecraft follow simplistic flight dynamics; however, a dash of realism is implemented by allowing the vessels to cut power to their engines and turn to face any direction while drifting along their original path—conservation of momentum. Clicking the mouse button shoots the ship's weapons at the location of the cursor. The interface has no radar display; the location of objects not shown on the screen are indicated by pointers at the screen's edges. Targeting, communications, and navigation data are displayed in information boxes that can be minimized.

After the pilot docks with a space station or lands on a planet, the screen and its interface change to a rendition of the area he is visiting. The player moves the pilot to different locations and interacts with certain objects, such as reading a bulletin board and talking to other characters, by clicking on their graphical representations. Freelancer's economy consists of buying and selling spacecraft, their armaments and components, and commodities. Certain goods are considered contraband in some systems, and they have to be smuggled past police patrols to their buyers. Computer-controlled characters (non-player characters or NPCs) in certain locations on the planets or stations offer quests and jobs.

Freelancer features a multiplayer mode, allowing up to 128 players to play together in a game. Multiplayer games are hosted on game servers; personal computers that meet the requirements for the game can act as a server. Gameplay is similar to the single-player mode, but is absent of story-driven quests. The server keeps individual records of the players' progress, and they can resume their game on their next log on to this server. A persistent virtual galaxy is thus maintained for them.

== Plot and setting ==
The events in Freelancer take place 800 years after those in the video game Starlancer (2000). (which meant that the game is set in 2960) The Solar System was engulfed in a civil war, fought between the Western Alliance and the Eastern Coalition. Facing defeat, the Alliance placed its people in stasis and sent them to the Sirius system, where they settled and transformed the surrounding space (the Sirius sector) into a region of political intrigue and opportunity. The rule of the sector is mostly split among four houses, each named after the sleeper ship that brought them to the system. Each house exhibits the culture of its terrestrial ancestor: Liberty of 1920s United States, Bretonia of Victorian era United Kingdom, Kusari of Shogunate era Japan, and Rheinland of Second Industrial Revolution Germany. The fifth sleeper ship, Hispania, suffered a malfunction en route and was abandoned in deep space (in the Omicron Alpha system). The descendants of its crew became pirates.

Freelancer's planetary bodies and space stations lie close to a single plane in each system, although some are above or below this plane and ships can travel out of the plane. There are 48 known star systems, and spacecraft can travel from one system to another by passing through jump gates. Within a system, spacecraft can travel in the trade lanes—a series of gates that connect to form a "space highway"—to quickly reach places of interest, such as planets, space stations, and mining operations. Asteroid and debris fields populate some of the systems, and secret hideouts and derelicts with valuable items exist in deep space. Merchant ships ply the trade lanes, carrying cargo from system to system and occasionally coming under attack by pirates. Police and Militaries generally patrol the areas, while larger warships can be found near some hubs.

=== Characters ===
The player takes on the role of Edison Trent, a "mercenary freebooter", in single-player mode. Regardless of Trent's background, the player can play him in different roles, such as being a trader, pirate, or bounty hunter. Throughout the story, Trent meets several NPCs, such as Liberty Security Force (LSF) commander Jun'ko Zane, xenoarchaeologist Professor Roland Quintaine, and head of a secret organization, Casper Orillion. Trent's relationships with these NPCs are pre-determined and illustrated by cutscenes; the player has no choice of import in Trent's interactions with these NPCs.

Most NPCs are aligned with a certain faction, such as the police, pirates, a company, or government. Each faction has its own agenda, and the relationships among them are interlinked in a web of alliances and hostilities. Player characters anger a faction and its allies by destroying its ships. Likewise, they gain the favor of a faction—and, to a smaller extent, its allies—by attacking its enemies. Player characters who have a bad relationship with a faction are attacked on sight by its forces and denied from docking with its stations. Paying bribes to a faction improves its attitude to the player character. Several NPCs with major roles are voiced by professional voice actors, such as Ian Ziering (Beverly Hills, 90210), Jennifer Hale (Metroid games), George Takei (Star Trek), and John Rhys-Davies (Indiana Jones films and Sliders). These NPCs are excluded from the multiplayer mode because of its lack of a campaign story (scripted missions).

=== Story ===
The plot of Freelancer's single-player campaign is illustrated with two hours worth of in-game cutscenes. The story is linear in structure—the player is unable to effect a different storyline—and broken down into stages. Cutscenes inform players of background events and the goals in a stage. Most stages have no time limits for their completion, and players can put the main story on hold while taking on missions (jobs) not crucial to it. However, players can only proceed to other regions of the Sirius sector, where more advanced ships, weaponry, and equipment are obtained, after completing missions that advance the story. Some stages are not introduced until the character has achieved a certain level (based on total worth accumulated), and it is not possible to gain sufficient levels just through the story itself, so players must spend at least some time on side missions to gain money to advance to the level required for the next stage of the story. This is also necessary as some stages would be too tough with only the money and items collected in the story.

On starting single-player mode, a cutscene shows the destruction of space station Freeport 7 by unknown forces, leaving Trent without money or ship on the planet Manhattan. While waiting for his debtor, Lonnigan, to regain consciousness, Trent takes up employment with the LSF under Jun'ko Zane, who provides him with a small ship. Lonnigan refuses to pay Trent when he awakes and is mysteriously taken away by the LSF. His death is later announced, and Trent is contacted by a thief who reveals that a mystery party destroyed Freeport 7 to get an artifact in the thief's possession. An LSF officer kills the thief, but the officer is shot by Zane in self-defense as she arrives at the scene. Zane and Trent are forced to flee Liberty space, traveling across approximately half of the Freelancer world in their flight. Trent locates xenoarcheology expert Dr. Quintaine to learn more about the artifact. While finding additional materials for their research, they discover the existence of the Nomad alien race, who are the caretakers of an empire that belonged to the previous inhabitants of the Sirius sector, the Dom'Kavash. The Nomads can possess humans and have slowly infiltrated the four Houses in this manner, planning to ignite a civil war to weaken the humans for elimination.

Trent joins the Order, a secret organization formed to combat the Nomads, and helps to rescue the Liberty president from the aliens. Quintaine's research reveals the artifact to be a map and the key to the Dom'Kavash's hyper gate—super jump gate—network, which currently acts as the Nomads' source of power. The Order launches an attack on what they believe to be the Nomads' homeworld, aiming to activate the hyper gates and cut off the Nomads from their power supply. The activated gates suck the Nomads to an unknown location, and the Order watches over the gates for their return. With the Nomads' defeat, events return to normal in the Freelancer world. Trent and Zane are granted full pardons by the governments, and Trent is asked by the Order to be their eyes and ears in Liberty space, allowing the player to continue the game without any story elements.

== Development ==
Concept drawing of a Bretonian city: the architecture in Freelancer is based on four societies in Earth's history; Bretonian structures are influenced by Victorian-era architecture.

In 1997, Chris Roberts began work on a vision he had since he first conceived Wing Commander. He wanted to realize a virtual galaxy, whose systems execute their own programs regardless of the players' presence; cities would be bustling with transports and each world's weather changes on its own time. Commodity prices in each star system would fluctuate, according to the activities of the computer controlled traders, who import and export goods. Roberts envisioned thousands of players simultaneously interacting with and influencing this world through a unique and intuitive user interface never seen before in other games. Each player could pursue a quest set up for their character, and join other players to attempt other missions together without needing to exit the game and start a new mode of play. Artificial intelligence would fly the players' spacecraft, letting them concentrate on combat or other tasks. Roberts intended the cutscenes and gameplay visuals to be of equal quality so players would be unable to distinguish between the two. By the end of 1997, it was officially announced that Freelancer was in the early stages of a two-and-a-half-year development schedule.

Two years later, the project was displayed at GameStock, an annual showcase to the mass media of Microsoft's games. The media covered the event, focusing on the features promised for this game. There were concerns about the state of the graphics and uncertainties over the promise of a dynamic economy, but gaming site GameSpot gave Roberts and his company, Digital Anvil, the benefit of their doubts. Initially in 1999, Roberts announced the game would be available on the market by fall 2000. However, the project suffered delays and by Electronic Entertainment Expo (E3) 2000, Roberts said the earliest release for the game was at the end of 2001.

In June 2000, Microsoft started talks to buy Digital Anvil. Roberts admitted that his team required large sums of money, which only a huge company could provide, to continue developing Freelancer with its "wildly ambitious" features and unpredictable schedule; the project had overshot its original development projection of three years by 18 months. Roberts hoped that Microsoft would not compromise his vision for Freelancer, and was convinced the software giant would not attempt the takeover if it did not believe Freelancer could sell at least 500,000 copies when released. Roberts left the company on completion of the deal, but assumed a creative consultant role on Freelancer until its release. Microsoft instructed Digital Anvil to scale down the ambitions of the project and focus on finishing the game based on what was possible and the team's strengths. Features such as the automated flight control, conversations that had different choices of responses, and sub-quests were abandoned. Despite the reductions, several reviewers believed the resultant product was still true to Roberts' vision.

The Freelancer team kept a low profile throughout 2001 before displaying a demo of their latest work at International Games Festival 2002, drawing large crowds. Microsoft announced the project was on schedule, and Digital Anvil added all the planned content for the game by October 2002. A beta test with approximately 500 testers was conducted, and the only main activities left were to refine the game's features and to fix errors uncovered in the testing. The game shipped to retailers on March 4, 2003, and was later available online through Yahoo's Game on Demand service. Digital Anvil's role on Freelancer ended on June 6, 2003, with their delivery of a software patch to resolve issues on the server and cheating; the staff were redeployed to other departments in Microsoft. In accordance with their five-year support policy for software, Microsoft stopped supporting the game on April 8, 2008, and shut down their global server in late 2007, which managed the list of multiplayer servers and the connection of players to them.

Freelancer's soundtrack was released by Sumthing Else Music Works on November 18, 2003. Composed by award-winning composer James Hannigan, music group Visual Music Incorporated, and Digital Anvil's musician and programmer Andrew Sega, it includes a bonus DVD that contains the game's alternative introduction movies, concept art, scripts, and deleted content. Communities of Freelancer players banded together to produce modified versions of the game. Their software modifications included new ships—including big capital ships—for players to fly and new factions for them to join. Certain modifications allowed the players to fly ships of one franchise against another, for example, Star Wars versus Wing Commander. The communities also worked around the loss of the global server, allowing players to host the modified games on their servers and continuing the Freelancer multiple-player online gaming world.

== Reception ==
=== Sales ===
In the United Kingdom, Freelancer sold roughly 20,000 units during the first half of 2003. Kristan Reed of GamesIndustry.biz wrote that these were "not figures that spell H.I.T."

=== Reviews and awards ===
Reception

Aggregate scores
Aggregator	Score
GameRankings	84.36%
Metacritic	85/100

Review scores
Publication	Score
AllGame	4/5
Eurogamer	8/10
GameSpot	8.3/10
GameSpy	83/100
IGN	9.2/10
PC Zone	8.4/10
FiringSquad	83%
GameCritics.com	6.0/10

Awards
Publication	Award
Game Critics Awards	Best of Show, Best PC Game, Best Simulation, and Outstanding Achievement in Graphics—1999
IGN	Game of the Month—March 2003

Chris Roberts is highly regarded in the field of spaceflight combat simulators due to his successful Wing Commander franchise. When the industry learned that he was creating a new spaceflight combat simulator, they paid close attention to it. In its first public showing at E3 1999, Roberts's Freelancer won four Game Critics Awards, including Best Game of the Show. Journalists at one of the game's later showings queued up to 90 minutes to catch a glimpse of a half-hour demonstration. Computer Gaming World, trusting Roberts's vision, named Freelancer as a game that would revolutionize the gaming industry. Shortly after the game was released, IGN called it the Game of the Month. Early in the game's development, the industry was enthusiastic about the prospect of playing in a world that changes without player interaction (a dynamic world), although there was caution over the possibility of such implementation with contemporary technology. Delays in the schedule and Microsoft's take over of Digital Anvil gave rise to speculation that Roberts's most promised feature—the dynamic world—would be cut.

The concerns were partially realized; the features, although not cut, were reduced, leaving Freelancer with a virtual world that did not live up to the industry's expectations. It presented a static galaxy, where territories of various factions never change despite the groups' frequent raids and attacks on each other, and commodity prices remain fixed. Nonetheless, reviewers from video game sites, such as Eurogamer and GameSpy, accepted the limitations and focused on other areas of the game. They found the lack of variety a greater detraction from the game than the compromised dynamic world. Excluding the single-player campaign, players never meet any memorable NPC because almost everyone sounds American. According to Game Nation TV, after playing for a while, every character and place looked similar to the extent that the game makes "Star Trek look like a xenomorphic zoo". Furthermore, instead of serving as entertainment, the missions, which entail the pilot to fly to a particular location and destroy the enemies there, are so repetitive that they become chores to the reviewers instead.

Scenes set against planetary systems such as this have earned praise from reviewers for their beauty.

Freelancer's graphics software was of older technology, but it did not detract from FiringSquad's praise of the game's artistic quality. The beautiful and realistic depictions of the universe impressed other reviewers, such as GameCritics.com and the Stratos Group. IGN, in particular, was enamored with the game's graphics, describing them as "simply gorgeous" with the best explosions and enormous ships. The mouse-and-keyboard flight control was praised by the industry. Several reviewers found it easy to shoot down enemy ships with the intuitive controls, but others pointed out that aerobatic maneuvers, such as jinking or barrel rolls, cannot be performed, reducing dogfights to overly simplistic and repetitive "chase or be chased" sequences that pale in comparison to the action in other spaceflight simulators.

On the story side, reviewers agreed the professional actors, such as Ian Ziering, did a good job in bringing their respective characters to life. However, criticism was placed on the lone voice who voiced all the generic male encounters for his monotonous delivery and making all his characters sound alike. The long cutscenes, which cannot be skipped, frustrated game journalist Tom Chick; he wanted to skip the scenes and continue playing instead of being forced to watch a clichéd story. Other reviewers expressed their own frustrations with the story, such as being forced to move to another star system at undesired times, or leaving them without an objective after the campaign abruptly ended.

FiringSquad said Freelancer's multiplayer mode encapsulated the "best and worst of [the game] in a nutshell": although players can move their characters anywhere, group with others for missions, and trade ships and equipment, they have very little else to do in the unchanging virtual galaxy. Despite these limitations, Stratos Group said the joy of playing with real-life counterparts is a positive factor; the NPC pilots are so inept that human-controlled pilots outperform them most of the time. However, as the missions are practically the same, IGN and GameCritics.com questioned the point of playing them repeatedly with friends. Furthermore, IGN thought it was meaningless to amass wealth and higher-grade equipment when they cannot be transferred to other servers. The lack of substance and repetitiveness led the gaming site to wonder how long Freelancer can be viable as a commercial multiplayer product. Whereas massively multiplayer online games such as EverQuest have thousands of players in a vast playing area, Freelancer can accommodate only up to 128; the loneliness of playing in such a sparsely populated virtual world gave UGO concern as well over the longevity of Freelancer's multiplayer mode.

Overall, reviewers acknowledged Freelancer fell short of the promises initially made by Roberts; however, it demonstrated a high quality of work in its implemented features. The various concepts were well meshed together to form an entertaining product. It never broke or raised the bar of its genre, but boasted a high production value, and has been said to be well worth the money. The game, however, was an anti-climax for those who were hooked by the touted and promised initial concepts, many of which were never realized. Freelancer was a "hugely ambitious game", as admitted by Chris Roberts, for a company to develop without the necessary capital and resources.

The editors of Computer Gaming World nominated Freelancer for their 2003 "Shooter of the Year" award, which ultimately went to Call of Duty. They wrote, "Freelancer dazzled us with its immersive interstellar world, wild combat, and ambitiously open-ended design, but it can't compete with the cinematic spectacle of Europe at war."

== Sequel ==
There were reports that Digital Anvil and Microsoft Game Studios worked on a Freelancer sequel called Project Lonestar for the Xbox 360 until Digital Anvil dissolved in 2006.
