= Iris (American band) =

American synthpop band

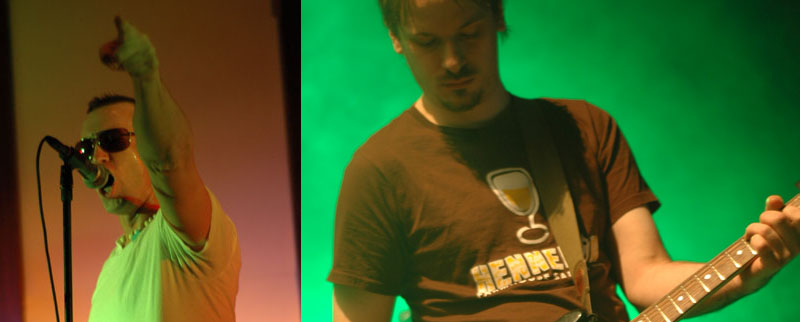
- Reagan Jones and Andrew Sega in 2009

Background information
- Also known as: Forgiving Iris (1993 – 1998)
- Origin: United States
- Genres: Synth-pop, electronic rock, indietronica
- Years active: 1993 – 2021
- Labels: Diffusion Records; Infacted Recordings; A Different Drum; Dependent Records
- Past members: Reagan Jones; Andrew Sega; Matthew Morris
- Website: http://www.irismusic.com

Iris was an American synthpop band, formed by Reagan Jones and Mat Morris in 1993. After the release of their first album Disconnect, Matthew Morris was replaced with Andrew Sega, who pushed the band's sound in a more experimental electronic direction. Their final album, Six, was released in September 2019. Iris disbanded in 2021.

== History ==
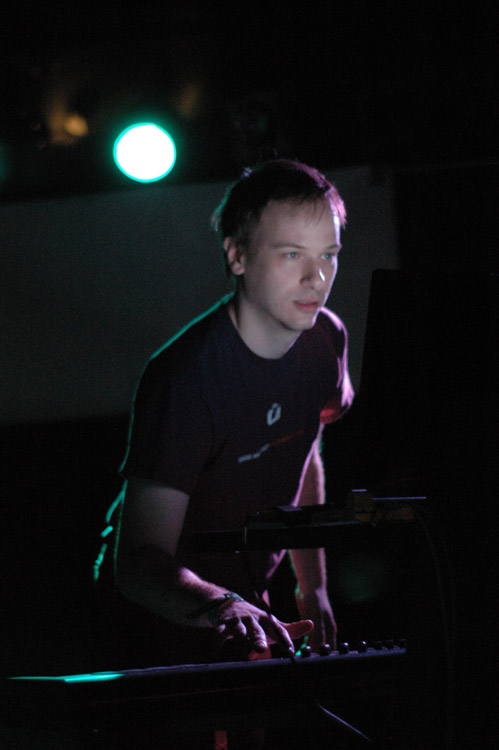
Andrew Sega joined Iris in 2002

The band was initiated in 1993 as Forgiving Iris, with members Reagan Jones (vocals/keyboards), Matt Morris (keyboards/programming). The two had met in college and, influenced by artists such as Erasure and Depeche Mode, began playing covers locally in Austin, Texas. In 1998 they changed their name to Iris and released their debut full-length, Disconnect, which netted them "Best Band" and "Best Album" awards at the American Synthpop Awards in 2000. Its single "Annie, Would I Lie To You?" was one of the best-selling records in label A Different Drum’s history.

After several shows that followed, Reagan Jones and Matthew Morris started having arguments about their musical direction. Morris became focused on his personal life, and wasn't interested into going back to the studio for the second album. Jones met Andrew Sega through the original singer of CTRL Joel Willard in 2001, and told him that he was looking for someone new to work with. Sega and Jones started working on some test tracks, the first of which would later become "Unknown". They felt that the chemistry between the two worked out so well that they started working on the new record that would become Awakening. Sega added guitars and pushed the band's sound into a more experimental electronic direction. They released their second album Awakening throughout Sega's new label, Diffusion Records. Their next record, Wrath (2005) took a more aggressive approach. Its first single, "Appetite" went No. 1 on mainstream radio in Poland. A European tour followed, including festivals in Moscow and London.

In 2008, Iris released their first CD/DVD combo, Hydra. It featured 3 brand new tracks, as well as remixes from bands like Mesh, Alpinestars, Datguy, Benz & MD, plus a 40 minute "behind the scenes" tour diary DVD.

In 2010, Iris released Blacklight through Infacted Recordings. After finishing its supporting tour in the U.S., the duo parted ways due to a tour argument. There was more than a year of silence between the band members, which ended when Jones sent Sega three demo songs.

In 2014, Iris signed with Dependent Records and released Radiant through the label, followed by Six in 2019.

Iris disbanded in September 2021. Dependent Records confirmed their split, saying that it was caused due to "personal differences".

== Members ==
=== Final line-up ===
- Reagan Jones - vocals, songwriting, keyboards (1993–2021)
- Andrew Sega - keyboards, guitars, programming, production (2002–2021)

=== Former members ===
- Matthew Morris - keyboards, programming, production (1993–2002)
- Marc Schultz - keyboards

=== Additional touring members ===
- Brian Pearson - guitars
- Blitz Carthey - drums

== Discography ==
=== Studio albums ===
- Disconnect (2000)
- Awakening (2003)
- Wrath (2005)
- Blacklight (2010)
- Radiant (2014)
- Six (2019)

=== Singles & EPs ===
- Danger Is The Shame (1999)
- Saving Time (1999)
- Annie, Would I Lie To You (1999)
- Lose In Wanting (2000)
- Unknown (2002)
- Appetite (2005)
- It Generates (2006)
- Hell's Coming With Me / Appetite (Remixes) (2006)
- Lands Of Fire 2008 (2008)
- Closer To Real (2010)
- Radiant Turbulence (2014) (Joint EP with Seabound)
- Phenom EP (2014) (Included in Radiant Complete Edition)

=== Other albums ===
- Reconnect (2003) - Remix Album, covering tracks from Disconnect
- Hydra (2008) - Remix Album (covering tracks from Wrath and Awakening), plus three new tracks ("New Invaders", "Stop Breaking Your Own Heart", "Nobody Wins") and a DVD with interviews, live show cuts, etc.
- Radiant Complete Edition (2014) - Collector's Edition Album of Radiant. A two vinyl & two CD version, which includes Phenom EP with its new songs ("Sing, Dark Choir" and "Inside We Are All One") on one of the CDs.
- Six (Luxus) (2019) - 500 Copy Limited Edition Album of Six. Includes four more songs ("Right Before My Eyes", “Back to life”,"I Wanna Be Adored" and "Price I Have To Pay") and three remixes by other bands, as well as an artbook.
