= Alex Brandon (photographer) =

American photographer

- Born: James Alexander Brandon; June 22, 1961 (age 65)
- Education: University of Missouri
- Occupation: Photojournalist
- Mother: Phyllis Dillaha Brandon
- Awards: Three Pulitzer Prizes

James Alexander "Alex" Brandon (born June 22, 1961) is an American photojournalist and Chief White House Photographer for the Associated Press. He has won three Pulitzer Prizes: two in 2006 for his contributions to the Times-Picayune's coverage of Hurricane Katrina, and another in 2021 for his contributions to Associated Press (AP) coverage of the 2020 Black Lives Matter protests. He is currently a staff photographer for the Associated Press in Washington, DC. Brandon shoots worldwide on various subjects, including Washington, D.C.–based sports, the United States military, and United States presidential campaigns.

== Life and work ==
James Alexander Brandon was born on June 22, 1961, to Phyllis Dillaha Brandon, a journalist who famously covered the Little Rock Central High School desegregation crisis. After graduating from the University of Missouri, Brandon began working as a photographer at the Arkansas Democrat-Gazette. In 1987, he covered a three-month expedition to Mount Everest.

Beginning in 1993, Brandon worked for the Times-Picayune in New Orleans. During that time, he covered two Super Bowls, the United Nations mission to Bosnia and Albania, military training exercises, and Gulf Coast hurricanes, including Katrina. For the latter, he was part of the team at the Times-Picayune that was awarded two Pulitzer Prizes. His work photographing and rescuing people from their flooded homes in the Lower Ninth Ward was covered in the National Geographic Hurricane Katrina Commemorative Collection

He began work at the Associated Press in 2006, working in New Orleans, Philadelphia, and Washington, D.C. He traveled with Barack Obama's 2008 presidential campaign, and since joining the AP staff in Washington, frequently travels with the White House, State Department, and Department of Defense. He was part of the team awarded the 2021 Pulitzer Prize for Breaking News Photography for his photographs of the 2020 Black Lives Matter protests in Washington, D.C.. On August 18, 2026, he was named Chief White House Photographer for the Associated Press.

== Awards and recognition ==
- 2005: Pulitzer Prize for Public Service while working at the Times-Picayune
- 2005: Pulitzer Prize for Breaking News Reporting while working at the Times-Picayune
- 2021: Pulitzer Prize for Breaking News Photography while working at the Associated Press
