= Blacklight (Iris album) =

Studio album by Iris
- Released: September 3, 2010
- Genres: Electronic rock, indietronica, electropop
- Length: 40:36
- Labels: Infacted Recordings; A Different Drum; Diffusion Records
- Producer: Andrew Sega

Iris chronology
Hydra (2008)	Blacklight (2010)	Radiant (2014)

Blacklight is the fourth studio album by Iris, released on September 3, 2010.

== Track listing ==
All tracks are written by Reagan Jones and Andrew Sega.

No.	Title	Length
1.	"Closer To Real"	4:04
2.	"xWires"	4:05
3.	"Panic Rev"	4:14
4.	"The Marianas Depths"	4:03
5.	"Disintegrate"	7:20
6.	"Fighter"	3:49
7.	"Red Right Return"	3:52
8.	"Prophetic"	4:23
9.	"Cruel Silence"	4:46
Total length:		40:36

== Personnel ==
Iris

- Reagan Jones - vocals, songwriting, keyboards
- Andrew Sega - keyboards, guitars, programming, production

Production

- Ken Porter - mixing and mastering
