= Beanbag (band) =

Australian Christian metal band

- Origin: Brisbane, Queensland, Australia
- Genres: Christian rock, alternative metal, nu metal
- Years active: 1995–2002
- Labels: Toupee; Inpop
- Past members: Philip "Hirvy" Hirvela; Michael Mullins; Hans Van Vliet; Murray McKenny; Phil Usher; Colin Hockey; Steven Lewis-Driver; Jesse Palmer

Beanbag was an Australian Christian alternative metal band that formed in 1995 in Brisbane and broke up in late 2002. The group consisted of Phillip "Hirvy" Hirvela on bass guitar, Michael Mullins on lead guitar, Hans "Hunz" Van Vliet on lead vocals, and Phil Usher on drums. In 1999 the group relocated to Nashville, Tennessee. Steven Lewis-Driver assumed the bass position when Hirvy left the band in early 2002. Jesse Palmer also filled in on guitar after Mullins returned to Australia a couple months before the band's demise. They released two albums on United States label, Inpop Records, Free Signal (2000) and Welladjusted (2001).

== History ==
Beanbag formed in Brisbane in 1995 as a "hardcore Christian rock group" by Phil "Hirvy" Hirvela on bass guitar, Michael Mullins on lead guitar, Hans "Hunz" Van Vliet on lead vocals, and a drummer, Murray. The name was suggested by the band's original drummer, shortly before he left the group. A year later Phil Usher joined on drums.

Guttersnipe, a seven-track extended play, was released on independent Australian label Toupee Records in June 1998. It was recorded at Groundswell studio with co-production by the group and Mark McElligott, it was engineered at Sunshine Studios by McElligott.

In mid-1999 they were the first act signed to United States label, Inpop Records, which was established in Nashville by Peter Furler (of Newsboys), his manager Wes Campbell and Brisbane-based businessman, Dale Bray. Their debut album, Free Signal (2000) included five tracks from Guttersnipe and new material recorded at Sunshine Studios with McElligott co-producing. Hirvy described how "Some of the newer songs are a bit more melodic but still intense. We've also got a bit of electronica, some Indian tablas (drums) and upright bass. We've always written music with groove in mind, so the new stuff is still old Beanbag, but with some new sounds and more melodic intensity."

John Dibase of Jesus Freak Hideout rated Free Signal at three-and-a-half stars, and explained that it is "a solid album with intricate, and down-right intriguing songs that may seem unorganized and spontaneous at first, but further listens reveal the method behind the madness."

During their time in the United States, Beanbag toured extensively (including touring with Newsboys and Sonicflood during the LoveLibertyDisco AirDome Tour), were nominated for two GMA Dove Awards, and had songs featured on several television soundtracks. Their second album for Inpop, Welladjusted (2001), was also produced by McElligott.

The band broke up after a van accident occurred while driving back to Nashville. The driver swerved to avoid a deer on the interstate, and the van and trailer filled with their gear ended up in a ditch. Van Vliet was hospitalised for three days with lung damage. With no vehicle, no gear, and no vocalist, they had decided to disband.

== Discography ==
- Welladjusted (2001, InPop)
- Free Signal (1999, InPop)
- Guttersnipe, EP (1998, Toupee)
- Chubb, EP (independent)
- The Dodgey Demo Tape (independent)
