= Dan Gardopée =

American electronic musician

Daniel Gardopée a.k.a. Dan Grandpre (a.k.a. Basehead in the tracker community) is an American electronic musician and former member of game music production company Straylight Productions. He was active in the tracking community during the 1990s and was a member of the groups Five Musicians and Kosmic Free Music Foundation.

As part of Straylight Productions, he had his music featured in many games, including Crusader: No Remorse, Crusader: No Regret, Unreal, Unreal Tournament and Deus Ex.

Gardopée co-composed three CD albums, AtmosphereS: Cultures, AtmosphereS: Moods and AtmosphereS: Pulses, together with Alexander Brandon.

In 2001, he had a single track release under the Basehead alias. This release was titled Beacon and was released by the netlabel Monotonik Records.

Since 2005, Gardopée has worked in-house at 2K Games, primarily as an audio engineer for the NBA 2K and WWE 2K series. He also writes reviews for Pitchfork Media.
