= Hunz =

Australian electronic pop music group

- Hunz live at the Troubadour, Brisbane, 28 May 2009

Background information
- Genres: Electronic music Pop music
- Years active: 2005–present
- Labels: Independent
- Members: Hans van Vliet
- Website: www.hunz.com.au

Hunz is an electronic pop music group from Brisbane, Australia. The name Hunz can refer to either the group or its composer, keyboardist and vocalist, Hans van Vliet.

The group was formed in 2005 by Johannes (Hans) van Vliet (born 15 December 1976), who is better known by his pseudonym Hunz. Hunz was raised in Brisbane, Australia and began working on tracker music in his early teens using Protracker, Fast Tracker 2, and Jeskola Buzz. Hunz is noted for being one of the first trackers to make the unconventional move of adding vocals to his compositions. He was also affiliated with the tracking groups Heretics, Analogue, Five Musicians (FM) and Hellven.

From 1999 to 2002, Hunz toured the United States as vocalist for the band Beanbag, who released two albums, Free Signal (2000) and Welladjusted (2001), on American label Inpop Records following their Australian independent debut, Guttersnipe (1998). The group disbanded in 2002 after a van accident that left Hunz hospitalized for three days with lung damage.

Hunz returned to the music community in 2005 with When Victims Fight, which was his first release under the Hunz moniker. The album was released on Apegenine Recordings on 20 June 2008 and was accompanied by a promotional video that displayed Hunz's motion design and visual art. When Victims Fight was critically acclaimed by Cyclic Defrost, Tokafi and Brisbane street press Time Off.

In February 2009, Hunz entered the RPM Challenge, in which musicians across the world attempt to write and record an album within a month. Second album Thoughts That Move was Hunz's RPM Challenge submission, which was independently released in May 2009 as a free high-quality download on Bandcamp. Hunz also included the Renoise (.XRNS) source files, which allows Renoise users to see how each of the album's ten tracks were arranged. The track Soon, Soon was included with the release of digital audio software application Renoise version 2.1. Thoughts That Move received positive reviews on Australian music site FasterLouder.com.au, Brisbane music blog Before Hollywood and in Brisbane street press Rave Magazine.
