= Reagan Jones =

American singer

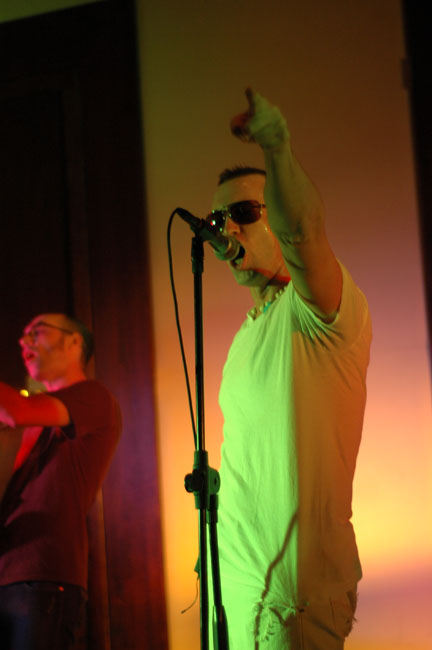
- Reagan Jones performing with Iris, 2008

Background information
- Also known as: RJ
- Born: Reagan Jones; March 2, 1973 (age 53); Lufkin, Texas, U.S.
- Origin: Los Angeles, California
- Genres: Electropop, indietronica
- Instruments: Vocals, keyboards
- Years active: 1993-2021
- Formerly of: Iris

Reagan Jones (born March 2, 1973, in Lufkin, Texas) is an American singer-songwriter, best known as the lead singer of synthpop band Iris. Jones formed Iris with Matt Morris in 1993, and remained the original vocalist for the band until its disbandment in 2021.

His influences include Depeche Mode, New Order, Idlewild, Imogen Heap, Coldplay, The Killers, Glenn Phillips, Guy Chadwick, R.E.M., Hubert Kah, among others. Jones is a practicing Christian and environmentalist.

== Discography ==
=== Iris ===
- Disconnect (2000)
- Awakening (2003)
- Wrath (2005)
- Hydra (2008)
- Blacklight (2010)
- Radiant (2014)
- Six (2019)
