= Tyrian (video game) =

1995 video game

- Developer: Eclipse Software
- Publisher: Epic MegaGames
- Designer: Jason Emery
- Artist: Daniel Cook
- Writer: Alexander Brandon
- Composers: Alexander Brandon; Andreas Molnar
- Platforms: MS-DOS, Windows
- Release: October 26, 1995 (Note: This date denotes the 1.1 version that released after the 1.0 shareware version, which was distributed from September 14, 1995.); 1999 (Tyrian 2000)
- Genre: Scrolling shooter
- Modes: Single-player, multiplayer

Tyrian is a vertically scrolling shooter developed by Eclipse Software for MS-DOS and published in 1995 by Epic MegaGames. Tyrian was programmed by Jason Emery, illustrated by Daniel Cook, and its music composed by Alexander Brandon and Andreas Molnar. A slightly enhanced version was published in 1999 as Tyrian 2000. The game was re-released as freeware in 2004.

== Plot ==
The game is set in the year 20,031. The player takes on the role of Trent Hawkins, a skilled spaceship pilot. While on the planet Tyrian, a hostile drone shoots his best friend, Buce Quesillac. Before dying Buce warns Trent that the drone belonged to the militaristic MicroSol megacorporation. MicroSol has discovered Gravitium (the game's brand of Unobtainium) on Tyrian and seeks to keep it a secret. Now on MicroSol's hit list, Trent manages to secure a small, armed spacecraft and set out to the free world of Savara.

== Gameplay ==
Tyrian follows the conventions of vertically scrolling shooters with forced forward movement. It was developed chiefly as a homage to the works of Compile, particularly their Zanac series.

The player controls a space ship fitted with different weapons (front and back, linked to the same button, and up to two external pods with their own buttons) and other equipment. The game presents a variety of enemies (some flying, some fixed, some on rails) and bosses, with many occurrences of fixed and/or indestructible obstacles. Before the player's starship is destroyed it must take enough damage to exhaust several points of shields (which regenerate over time) and armor.

Tyrian's full game mode features a credit and equipment-buying system, and the shield/armor hit points which are similar to game mechanics in Raptor: Call of the Shadows. The arcade mode has characteristics from coin-op arcade shooters, such as in-game powerups and extra lives.

=== Difficulty ===
There are three levels of difficulty to choose from: Easy, Medium, and Hard, as well as the hidden options of Impossible, Suicide, and Lord of the Game. Hard difficulty and above employ enemies with more health as well as fire more bullets per second. Certain hidden levels are only available at hard difficulty, which provide ample opportunities for unique powerups and upgrades. In certain levels, the Hard setting also prevents the player from seeing enemies outside a conical line-of-sight. Upon completion of the game, the player receives a password for one of the several hidden ships, as well as the options for replaying the game at a higher difficulty setting.

=== Full story mode ===
Fighting enemies in Savara

The "full story mode" is a single-player mode that features a story-based campaign and ship customization. The story is told through the message cubes that can be collected within and read between levels. Some of these message cubes are readily available while others need to be obtained by destroying certain enemies in the preceding level. At certain points in the game, the storyline branches and the player is required to pick one branch.

The player's craft is customizable. It can accommodate a front weapon and a rear weapon. Shops can supply a variety of kinetic guns, rayguns, missiles, and bombs for these two slots. While the front weapons are mostly limited to forward arcs, "rear" weapons often come with wider coverage including side and rear shots. Some rear weapons have two selectable fire modes, focusing either mostly forward, or mostly sideways or rearward.

Weapons can be upgraded up to 10 times. Higher levels cost exponentially more and require a more powerful generator to support them. Other upgrades include increased shields, more powerful generators to allow for stronger weapons and shields, more armor, and higher maneuverability. Shops differ in terms of the ships, generators, and weapons they have for sale. However, shops can upgrade any component, even those that they don't sell.

The player can also purchase up to two "sidekicks" which fly alongside the ship. Some simply act as a complementary weapon that fire whenever the ship fires; others are powerful weapons with limited ammunition that need to be manually activated. Sidekicks are not always upgradable.

=== Arcade mode ===
In arcade mode, the player starts with a moderate ship and picks up the front guns, rear guns, and sidekicks along the way, instead of purchasing them. Front weapons are upgraded by picking up purple bubbles from destroyed enemies. The number of purple orbs required increases exponentially to advance to higher power levels. Front and rear guns can also be upgraded to the next level by picking up power-up pods, which are found by destroying a specific enemy. The ship, shields, and generators are not upgradeable.

The arcade mode can be played with one or two ships, by one or two players. The ships are called the "Dragonhead" and "Dragonwing". Both players can combine their ships into one, forming the "Steel Dragon", with the first player controlling the combined ship, and the second player controlling a turret. Tyrian enables the two players to be connected via modem.

The Dragonhead has front gun powerups (with more variety than the Dragonwing's rear gun pickups), has better maneuverability, and a smaller profile making it easier to dodge enemy fire. It also controls the "special" power-up weapons such as the Soul of Zinglon or Repulsor. The Dragonwing is larger and slower but more heavily armored. It picks up the rear power-ups, although unlike the equivalent single-player rear gun, the Dragonwing fires it mostly forward instead of the side or rear. The Dragonwing also controls the sidekick weapons. The player can also increase the power of the Dragonwing's weapon by not firing them for short time, letting them to accumulate extra charges. There are five charge levels for each weapon, and collecting the spherical purple powerups gives the Dragonwing the ability to charge-up faster.

=== Timed battle ===
In this mode, available in Tyrian 2000 only, the player chooses from three levels to play in (Deliani, Space station, and Savara). The player is given a set time to complete the level, while collecting power-ups, fighting off enemies and killing the boss. When the level is complete, the score is calculated depending on time spent, ship's integrity, destruction caused, and enemies killed.

=== Super arcade ===
The game also features 7 (9 in Tyrian 2000) hidden "super arcade" modes with specialized ships, requiring the user to type in certain codewords which are shown after beating the game. (The first code is given by beating the regular game, and each consecutive code is given after beating the mode which comes before it.)

=== Super Tyrian ===
This mode, which is enabled by typing "engage" at the title screen, disables all cheat codes and command parameters and sets the difficulty to Lord of the Game (or Suicide if the Scroll Lock key is held down). The player possesses a Stalker 21.126 ship, along with a small shield and only one weapon, the Atomic Rail Gun. No other weapons are available; however the ship is able to generate many different weapons when the player performs particular sequences of movements and weapon-firing. The "headlight effect" is always turned on in Super Tyrian, which can obscure objects that are not within a 90-degree field of view in front of the player's ship.

=== Mini-games ===
Destruct is a minigame concealed inside Tyrian, reminiscent of Scorched Earth, with human-vs-human and human-vs-computer modes of play. It can be played by typing "destruct" at the main menu screen.

In the Zinglon's Ale mini-game, players must try to gather as much ale as possible, while dodging wave after wave of bouncing enemies, and clearing the screen of enemies fully before advancing to the next level. If not cleared, the game continues infinitely while growing ever harder.

Zinglon's Squadrons is a mini-game similar to Galaxian or Galaga. Large formations of ships fly down to attack. Individual ships in the groups break off to fly down in various ways. Players must destroy the whole fleet to advance to the next fleet.

In the mini-game Zinglon's Revenge a giant ship projects a horizontal field of energy. Small enemies fall down from above and bounce around the edges of the screen and against the energy field. Touching the field or one of the small enemies could be deadly. Players must shoot all the small enemies to advance to the next level.

== Development ==
Tyrian was developed by a credited total of 11 people, with "three main drivers": Alexander Brandon (composer and writer), Jason Emery (programmer and level designer), and Daniel Cook (artist and interface designer). For the aforementioned developers, Tyrian was their first commercial video game.

The origins of Tyrian began as an experiment in 1991, with a young Jason Emery showing his friend Alexander Brandon the preliminary workings of a scrolling background. The two continued developing, and eventually decided the work could be shown to a game company. Brandon wrote a proposal document and sent it to the two leading shareware game publishers of the time, Epic MegaGames and Apogee. However, the game lacked any sound or music, and the graphics were "definitely not professional". As such, "neither got overly excited", but both showed interest.

The two developers thought they would never find a publisher. However, after a long wait, Robert Allen—head of Safari Software—considered Tyrian to fit perfectly with their company, which handled smaller scale projects. Robert Allen had word from Cliff Bleszinski that Tyrian was very similar to Zanac, thinking that it should be followed up.

Robert Allen gave leads to sound coders and artists, the first being Bruce Hsu who created interface graphics and character faces. Artist Daniel Cook was hired after composer Alexander Brandon showed interest in his artwork, which was—unbeknown to Cook—"sent around" by a friend. After he was sent a short list of levels, Cook created sample artwork on an Amiga 1200. It was met with praise by the other developers, who asked him to "make some more!". The artwork was completed in a 4-month period.

After work began on graphics, the popularity of Tyrian rose at Epic MegaGames. Arturo Sinclair from Storm Front Studios joined to create rendered artwork for planets and character faces. The developers wanted a "simple and fun" interface, and changed it at least three times before deciding on a final design. At this point, Tyrian was almost complete; with the "Loudness" sound system, near-completed sound effects, and a marketing plan headed by Mark Rein. At this time, Tim Sweeney approached the team and informed them Tyrian was to be published as a full-fledged Epic MegaGames product. It was later released in 1995.

== Release ==
Version 1.0 of the game was released as shareware on September 14, 1995, consisting of episode 1 of the game. Released one month later on October 26, Version 1.1 was the first published registered version, consists of the first three episodes, and includes various bugfixes. The registered version also includes the ship editor, which was later available as separate download. Version 2.0 added Episode 4 (An End to Fate) and several new game modes, like the two-player mode. Version 2.01/2.1 fixed some keyboard bugs and includes the "Christmas mode", triggered by starting the game in December.

In 1999, Tyrian was re-released by XSIV Games as Tyrian 2000. It includes a fifth episode, bug fixes, and additional ships Although it claims Windows compatibility, this is achieved using a .PIF file, not by building a native Windows application. Tyrian 2000 is also distributed for free on GOG.com, running through DOSBox.

== Ports ==
World Tree Games developed versions for the Game Boy Color and Game Boy Advance. After the publisher Symmetry Entertainment closed down, the European publisher Stealth Productions (Stealth Media Group) obtained the publication rights, but the game was cancelled.

Both Game Boy versions were eventually released in 2007 as freeware by World Tree Games.

In the Game Boy Color version, the Full Game condenses the story from Episodes 1-4, but planet Ixmucane core always gets destroyed at the end, and the levels were redesigned. The rear weapon from the DOS game is not available. The player can carry two Sidekick weapons at once, but only one is usable at a time. New game modes and items can be unlocked by purchasing Extras using credits obtained by completing a stage.

The Game Boy Advance version incorporates graphics from the original, but the level layout and game play are based on the Game Boy Color game. Two Sidekick weapons can be fired at the same time. Super Arcade and audio are not included. New to this game is Challenge mode, where additional levels are unlocked by completing existing Challenge levels.

== Audio ==
The music of Tyrian was created by Alexander Brandon with additional music by Andreas Molnar, and is in the LDS (Loudness Sound System) format. The Tyrian 2000 CD includes 25 of the tracks in red book audio format. The red book tracks are omitted from the freeware version due to the download size. The tracks "ZANAC3" and "ZANAC5" are reproductions of two songs from the MSX/NES game Zanac.

Alexander Brandon released the music of Tyrian for free in August 2010.

== Reception ==
The game mostly received positive reviews. Tyrian scored 87% in PC Gamer (one percent below their Editor's Choice award). A reviewer for Next Generation complimented the use of a shop system for acquiring powerups, the ability to save games at any time, and the inclusion of a storyline to provide a reason behind "killing everything you see." He scored the game four out of five stars. Computer Gaming World nominated Tyrian as "Action Game of the Year". The original developers Jason Emery and Alexander Brandon considered Tyrian's reception "far more" than their expectations.

== Legacy ==
In February 2007 the Pascal and x86 assembly source code for Tyrian was delegated to a small group of developers to re-write in C, in a project named OpenTyrian, licensed under the GNU GPL-2.0-or-later. Jason Emery released Tyrian in 2007, along with some Game Boy and Game Boy Advance versions. Following that announcement, in April 2007 Daniel Cook announced the free availability of his Tyrian artwork (not including the later work for the Game Boy Color edition and for Tyrian 2000) under generic liberal terms of the open content Creative Commons Attribution 3.0 License.
