= Starlancer =

2000 video game

- Windows cover art
- Developers: Warthog Games; Digital Anvil
- Publisher: Microsoft Games; Dreamcast; Crave Entertainment: EU: Ubi Soft
- Producer: Erin D. Roberts
- Designers: Nick Elms; Philip Meller; Erin D. Roberts; Rob Taylor-Hendry
- Programmers: Paul Hughes; Derek Senior
- Artists: Nick Elms; Philip Meller
- Composers: David Blinston; Ian Livingstone
- Platforms: Windows, Dreamcast
- Release: April 28, 2000: Windows; EU: April 28, 2000; NA: May 3, 2000 Dreamcast; NA: December 6, 2000; EU: March 23, 2001
- Genre: Space simulator
- Modes: Single player, multiplayer

Starlancer is a 2000 space-based science fiction flight simulator computer game created by Erin and Chris Roberts and developed by Warthog Games under the auspices of Digital Anvil.

== Plot ==
It is the year 2160. Mankind has colonized the Solar System and two political entities have emerged: the Alliance consisting of American, Australian, French, Spanish, Italian, Japanese, British and German forces, and The Coalition of Russian, Chinese and Middle-Eastern interests. The game begins with a surprise attack on Fort Kennedy, where a peace treaty turns into a bloodbath: all of the inner four planets are overrun, including Terra herself, and the Italian and French fleets are utterly lost. The Alliance fleet regroups at Triton, Neptune's moon, and attempts to regain lost territory. The player takes the role of a rookie pilot in the international 45th Volunteers squadron, under the command of Captain Robert Foster and Wing Commander Maria Enriquez, aboard the re-commissioned British carrier ANS Reliant.

== Gameplay ==
As with Wing Commander: Prophecy, the pilot's flying ability is the only measure by which success and failure are defined, though Starlancer does not feature as many branching mission paths. As in Wing Commander I the pilot may be promoted throughout the course of the campaign; unlike WCI, their rank determines which fighters and missiles they may choose to employ during each mission. The game provides a "virtual carrier" through which to navigate, including nearby crewmembers whose reaction to you depends on your current rank and standing. The game uses textual and video news broadcasts to keep the player informed as to the status of the rest of the war. Players frequently find themselves flying alongside squadrons and pilots they have heard about on the news just recently, providing a dose of "celebrity exposure" and this gives the sense that the player is just one part of a much larger war effort.

Starlancer's story is continued in Chris Roberts' Freelancer project, though the two belong to different subgenres (the first is purely focused on action, the latter also features trading and the player can freely move through the game's universe when they are not on a mission).

The game allows the player to take control of 12 fighter-class ships, advancing in different areas, such as top speed, agility, armor, and shield power. Each have a number of hard points which can be used to mount weapons like guided missiles and dumb rockets. Ships are issued to the player as his or her achievements increase.

Starlancer was also available on the Dreamcast console. GameSpy hosted its online play with up to six players at once. It can still be played online today via private servers. Although most of the graphics and frame rate were intact, the game did not include the intricate menu system and options that the PC had.

== Reception ==
Reception

Aggregate score
Aggregator	Score	
Aggregator	Dreamcast	PC
Metacritic	79/100	78/100

Review scores
Publication	Score	
Publication	Dreamcast	PC
AllGame	3/5	4/5
CNET Gamecenter	N/A	5/10
Computer Games Strategy Plus	N/A	3.5/5
Computer Gaming World	N/A	3.5/5
Electronic Gaming Monthly	7.33/10 (Note: In Electronic Gaming Monthly's review of the Dreamcast version, two critics gave it each a score of 7/10, and the other 8/10.)	N/A
EP Daily	8/10	7.5/10
Eurogamer	7/10	7/10
Game Informer	7/10	N/A
GameRevolution	B+	B+
GameSpot	7.1/10	7.7/10
GameSpy	6/10	92%
IGN	8.8/10	9.2/10
Next Generation	3/5	4/5
PC Gamer (US)	N/A	75%

The game received "generally favorable reviews" on both platforms according to the review aggregation website Metacritic. Chris Kramer of NextGen said of the PC version in its July 2000 issue, "You'll definitely love StarLancer on its own, and as an appetite for next year's FreeLancer [sic], we're already salivating." (Ironically, Freelancer was not released until 2003.) Seven issues later, however, Kevin Rice said that the Dreamcast version "doesn't give the same intense experience as its big brother on PC, but it's still OK. Just be prepared to wrestle with controls beyond movement and weapons."

Kevin "BIFF" Giacobbi of GameZone gave the PC version nine out of ten, calling it "a beautiful game in which one will find hours of entertainment." Brian Wright of GamePro said called the same PC version "a solid game that action fans are sure to enjoy." (Note: GamePro gave the PC version two 4.5/5 scores for graphics and sound, and two 4/5 scores for control and fun factor.) Later, Air Hendrix said, "If you've played the PC version of StarLancer, the Dreamcast version offers nothing new—the missions are identical. But StarLancer's thrilling space combat gives Dreamcast pilots a lot to get pumped about." (Note: GamePro gave the Dreamcast version all 4.5/5 scores for graphics, sound, control, and fun factor.)

The PC version was commercially unsuccessful. PC Data reported its sales at 28,685 units and revenues at $1.21 million in the U.S. by July 2000, which Mark Asher of CNET Gamecenter described as a "major disappointment". He cited this performance as part of a trend of falling sales for space flight simulators and the wider flight simulator genre. According to designer Eric Peterson, the game ultimately sold around 400,000 units by late 2001—below expectations at Digital Anvil.

The PC version was a runner-up for "Best Game No One Played" at IGN's Best of 2000 Awards. It was also a finalist for the "Sci-fi Simulation of the Year" award at GameSpot's Best and Worst of 2000 Awards, which went to MechWarrior 4: Vengeance.

== See also ==
- Privateer 2: The Darkening
