= Ironseed =

1994 video game

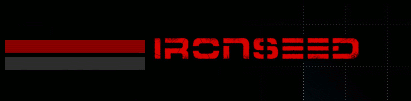
- Ironseed logo (website version)
- Developer: Channel 7
- Publisher: Softdisk
- Designer: Jeremy Stanton
- Programmer: Robert W. Morgan III
- Composer: Andrew Sega
- Platform: MS-DOS
- Release: 1994
- Genre: Space trading and combat simulator
- Mode: Single-player

The main game screen. Top left side: 3D starmap, top right side: ship status and resources. Bottom left: message window, bottom right: interaction "cube".

Ironseed is a 1994 MS-DOS video game, developed and published by Channel 7. It is a space trading and combat game with real-time strategy elements.

== Plot ==
The game plays in fictional alternative reality in the future, several hundred years ahead. The game starts when the eponymous space ship, the "Ironseed", flees a theocracy on Mars. The ship is crewed by disembodied, digitized rebels originally scheduled for termination. In hastily fleeing, the ship suffers damage and gets lost in time and space. The crew finds itself in unknown space somewhere in the Milky Way with a badly damaged ship and nearly depleted fuel reserves. First objective is therefore finding resources for ship repairs and fuel while gathering intelligence about the surrounding space and also their own history. After encountering other alien species and learning about some greater threat, the ultimate goal becomes to forge an alliance of several alien races to counter this threat.

== Gameplay ==
The player begins with a single ship and a chosen crew. Planets are randomly generated and numerous ship designs and crew selection allow for different playing styles. Technology research, space exploration, resource management and gathering, production, crew management and alien diplomacy are essential elements. New ships, new upgrades, and ancient artifacts help the player in their efforts. Combat can be both in the form of random encounters or planned for by the player.

== History ==
=== Development and release ===
The story and art were created by Jeremy Stanton, the code was written by Robert W. Morgan III. The music was composed by the computer musician Andrew Sega who gained reputation in the 1990s demoscene as Necros. The game was released and distributed by Softdisk in 1994.

=== Legacy and support ===
The game was written with Borland Turbo Pascal for DOS and the usual hardware at that time. Also, like many software at that time, a buggy CRT library included in Turbo Pascal was used, resulting in 'Runtime Error 200' messages on CPUs faster than approximately 200 MHz. Therefore, running the game on modern OSes and faster hardware needed emulation solutions like DOSBox. The "Runtime error 200" bug was finally fixed with a fan patch in 2013, almost 20 years after the game's original release.

=== Successor and source-code release ===
After the game was unavailable commercially for many years it was re-released as freeware around 2003 to promote the development of the successor Ironseed II / Ironseed Reborn. As progress on the development of the successor and further patching of Ironseed was unlikely, the source code of "Ironseed 1" was released by the developers to the public under the GPL in March 2013. A final patch (v1.20.0016) was released with the source code, but also the forum was shut down. Later version 1.30.0001 was put on GitHub, for the first time including the graphic assets and sound effects under GPL, but the commercial DMP sound module stripped out to comply with its license. From the source code release missing is also the soundtrack, while it seems the rights on the soundtrack still belong to the developers. For instance, Morgan redistributes the soundtrack on his personal website and also the freeware release included the soundtrack. In September 2013, due to availability of the source code, a Free Pascal and SDL based port for Linux became available on GitHub. In August 2015 the Ironseed.com mainsite went offline without warning, but came back online in January 2016 under a new ironseed.net domain. In April 2016 the game was ported to the ARM-based Pandora handheld, based on the previous Linux port. Since August 2020, there is bugfixed SDL port available.

=== Port and re-release ===
Work on a re-skinned re-release by the original developers as a port for Windows is underway using the Unity Engine. Samples and the forum for discussion can be found on reddit in the ironseed subreddit.

== Reception ==
Ironseed received a Top Dog award from Home of the Underdogs, who highlighted the game's replayability through the random planets and options, and allowance of different playing styles through the various ship designs and crews. It drew comparisons with the earlier Starflight series and the later Master of Orion.

In March 1995, the Slovenian computer magazine "Megazin" rated Ironseed 63 of 100. In March 2017, Rock Paper Shotgun's Adam Smith revisited Ironseed, compared it to Star Control 2 and Captain Blood, and described it as "weird, trippy sci-fi that blew my tiny mind" and "a little bit Space Rangers, a little bit Star Control and just a teensy bit FTL".
