= MLB Slugfest 2006 =

2006 video game

- Developer: Blue Shift
- Publisher: Midway Home Entertainment
- Series: MLB Slugfest
- Platforms: PlayStation 2, Xbox
- Release: NA: June 5, 2006
- Genre: Sports (baseball)
- Modes: Single-player, multiplayer

MLB SlugFest 2006 is a baseball video game developed by Blue Shift and published by Midway in 2006 for the PlayStation 2 and Xbox. It is the fourth and final game in the MLB Slugfest series.

== Reception ==
Reception

Aggregate score
Aggregator	Score	
Aggregator	PS2	Xbox
Metacritic	56/100	59/100

Review scores
Publication	Score	
Publication	PS2	Xbox
1Up.com	C	C
AllGame	2.5/5	2.5/5
Game Informer	5/10	5/10
GameRevolution	C−	C−
GameSpot	5.9/10	5.9/10
GameSpy	2/5	2/5
GameTrailers	N/A	7.5/10
IGN	6.5/10	6.5/10
Official U.S. PlayStation Magazine	4/10	N/A
Official Xbox Magazine (US)	N/A	5.5/10

The game received "mixed" reviews on both platforms according to the review aggregation website Metacritic.
