= Awakening (Iris album) =

Studio album by Iris
- Released: 2003
- Genre: Electronic rock, indietronica
- Length: 47:48 (U.S.); 64:35 (EU); 54:02 (PL)
- Label: Diffusion Records, Infacted Recordings, MusicNet, Q-Code Records
- Producer: Andrew Sega

Iris chronology
Disconnect (2000)	Awakening (2003)	Reconnect (2003)

Awakening is the second album by indietronica group Iris, released in 2003. Awakening was the first album to feature Andrew Sega, who added guitars and pushed the band's sound into a more experimental electronic direction.

== Background ==
After several shows that followed after Disconnect, Reagan Jones and Matthew Morris started having arguments about their musical direction. Morris was focused on his personal life, and he wasn't interested in going back into the studio for the second album. He met Andrew Sega through the original singer of CTRL Joel Willard in 2001, and told him that Jones was looking for someone new to work with. Sega and Jones started working on some test tracks, the first of which would later become "Unknown". They felt that the chemistry between the two worked out so well that they started working on the new record that would become Awakening.

== Versions ==
In total there are 5 versions of this album.

Country	Year	Label	Number of Tracks	Notes
US	2003	Diffusion Records	10	Limited edition. Sold out in a couple of weeks.
US	2003	Diffusion Records	10	Current edition in US
Germany	2003	Infacted Recordings	10 + 3 Remixes	Different track order & 2 mixes by Andrew Sega & 1 mix by Mat Morris
Poland	2003	MusicNet	10 + 1 Remix	1 mix by Mat Morris
Russia	2006	Q-Code Records	10 + 3 Remixes	Same as German version.

== Track listing US ==
All tracks are written by Reagan Jones and Andrew Sega except * by Mitchell Adrian & David Michael (a.k.a. Seven Red Seven).

No.	Title	Writer(s)	Length
1.	"Whatever"		4:27
2.	"When I'm Not Around"		6:00
3.	"Sentimental Scar"		4:13
4.	"Unknown"		4:23
5.	"Sorrow Expert"		3:52
6.	"You're the Answer*"	Seven Red Seven	5:14
7.	"In Spite"		4:53
8.	"Vacant"		4:47
9.	"Wait Move On"		4:49
10.	"Island"		5:11
Total length:			47:48

== Track listing Europe ==
All European versions have their album artwork tinted magenta.

All tracks are written by Reagan Jones and Andrew Sega except * by Mitchell Adrian & David Michael (a.k.a. Seven Red Seven).

No.	Title	Writer(s)	Length
1.	"Whatever"		4:27
2.	"Unknown"		6:00
3.	"Sorrow Expert"		4:13
4.	"When I'm Not Around"		4:23
5.	"Sentimental Scar"		3:52
6.	"You're the Answer*"	Seven Red Seven	5:14
7.	"In Spite"		4:53
8.	"Vacant"		4:47
9.	"Wait Move On"		4:49
10.	"Island"		5:11
11.	"Sorrow Expert (Crucible Mix) ^{1}"	Andrew Sega	5:30
12.	"In Spite (Magenta Mix) ^{2}"	Andrew Sega	5:20
13.	"Unknown (Sub Rosa Mix)"	Mat Morris	6:26
Total length:			64:35

== Personnel ==
- Reagan Jones - vocals, songwriting, keyboards
- Andrew Sega - keyboards, guitars, programming, production

== Comments ==
^{1}, ^{2} - do not appear on Polish version.
