= Conquest: Frontier Wars =

2001 video game

- Developers: Digital Anvil (1996–2000); Fever Pitch Studios (2000–2001)
- Publisher: Ubi Soft
- Producer: Eric Peterson
- Designers: Dan Orzulak; James Wiggs; Arvee Garde
- Programmers: Jason Yenawine; Thomas Mauer; Robert Marr; Sean Barton; Aaron Hunter
- Artist: Sergio Rosas
- Composer: James Hannigan
- Platform: Microsoft Windows
- Release: NA: August 18, 2001; UK: November 23, 2001
- Genre: Real-time strategy
- Modes: Single player, multiplayer

Conquest: Frontier Wars is a real-time strategy game released in 2001 by Ubi Soft and developed by Fever Pitch Studios. A good amount of the development was done at Digital Anvil in Austin, Texas, a startup developer originally owned by Chris Roberts, Erin Roberts, Eric Peterson, John Miles, Tony Zurovec, Marten Davies and Robert Rodriguez. Once Microsoft purchased Digital Anvil, Eric Peterson and Tom Mauer left to form Fever Pitch Studios Inc, and lead a team to complete the game as originally intended by the team. On December 9, 2013, the source code was bundled with every copy of the game purchased on GOG.com.

== Gameplay ==
Bases can be constructed on any discovered planet in any system, but would not be operable until a wormhole connecting that system to a friendly one was locked with a jumpgate or until a friendly Headquarters, Cocoon (Mantis) or Acropolis (Celareon) was constructed in the system. Supplies play a vital part in offensive operations, as each ship carries only a limited amount of supplies, which are depleted as weapons and special devices are used. Ships with fully depleted supply stores are completely ineffective except as cannon fodder until they return to a supply base for resupply. For this reason, players usually cannot maintain the momentum of their assaults in enemy-controlled systems unless their fleet is accompanied by supply vessels.

Conquest features a number of Admirals in the single-player campaign, which function similarly to hero units. In single-player skirmish and multiplayer games, Admirals act essentially as leader units (Warlords for Mantis and Magistrates for Celareons). Entire squadrons of other ships can be grouped with an Admiral shuttle; this endows the Admiral's combat bonuses upon the entire fleet and allows the player to better control their forces. When a Leader is joined with a fleet, every ship in the fleet is given at least a 10% bonus to supply, damage, speed, etc., and usually depending on the Leader's flagship in the Terran campaign, an additional 10% bonus is given to certain ships in the fleet for all statistics.

All Leaders are different, and give a 25% bonus instead of the standard 10% bonus to certain statistics depending on their flagship and their role in the campaign. For example, Admiral Steele enters the campaign at around the same time the Terrans meet and form an alliance with the Celareons. Due to differing factions within the mechanical-energy race there becomes a hostile Celareon faction, and Admiral Steele's career garners him more experience in warfare against Celareons than any other Admiral. As a result, in skirmish or multiplayer games Steele has a special bonus to damage solely against Celareons. Likewise, Warlord Kertak, a Mantis rebel and ally, possesses a fighter carrier flagship; her fleets have special bonuses to carriers' fighters instead of larger ships, improving their agility, targeting, and damage.

== Storyline ==
Conquest's storyline is set two hundred years in the future, where interstellar travel was possible by jumping through networks of wormholes leading to other systems.

Following a series of internal conflicts, mankind has discovered a wormhole leading to an unknown system, Tau Ceti. Arriving in the Tau Ceti system, the TNS Andromeda, under the command of Rear Admiral Tackwhether Hawkes, is caught between a small, fast, unidentified alien spacecraft and its pursuers. After the Andromeda is destroyed in a collision with a massive alien warship, you, as the anonymous Commander, are ordered by Admiral William Halsey to investigate. With the help of Captain Thomas Blackwell, you begin exploring uncharted wormholes in order to discover what happened to the Andromeda and to find and rescue Admiral Hawkes if he is still alive.

After learning that Admiral Hawkes escaped the destruction of the Andromeda and has been taken prisoner by the unidentified alien race, dubbed the "Mantis", you penetrate deeper into hostile territory in order to rescue him. Soon, Earth and its Navy find themselves embroiled in the middle of a Mantis civil war, with the usurper Queen Ver'Lak fighting her sister, Warlord Ker'Tak. Fearing for its own safety in the face of the massive Imperial Mantis fleet, Earth assists Ker'Tak in the fight. In response, Ver'Lak assigns her chief Lieutenant, Warlord Malkor, to hunt down and destroy Earth.

During a dangerous mission to rescue Mantis warlords still loyal to Ker'Tak, Captain Blackwell's corvette is lost in a rogue black hole while trying to see what happened to a ship you send to scout beyond an uncharted wormhole. In spite of this tragic loss, Halsey and Ker'Tak order a large-scale offensive against Malkor's supply lines in the Orion Arm, assigning Admiral Benson to assist you. Benson is a good soldier, but is hardly pleasant to work with, as she fully blames you for her friend Blackwell's death.

Blackwell turns out to be very much alive, however, returning in a critical moment with yet more alien reinforcements. The Celareons have constructed a type of artificial wormhole technology, and had tested it out in the rescue of Captain Blackwell from the black hole, and used it again to transport him back to a Mantis controlled system that the Terrans are attacking. A meeting is soon arranged between the Terran Admiralty and the ruling council of the energy-based Celareons. The territory of this advanced species sits astride the raging Mantis Civil War, and the conflict threatens to engulf their systems.

The two races agree to an alliance against Ver'Lak's forces, but the meeting soon reveals a surprising and dangerous development. Admiral Halsey is shown a data transmission, sent from the heart of Terran space to the Mantis, which was intercepted and recorded by the Celareons. Vital information on Earth's location and defensive systems has been leaked to the Mantis by a Terran traitor, prompting a massive investigation to discover who has betrayed humanity to its enemies.

The ambitious Admiral Smirnoff discovers proof to Admiral Halsey that Admiral Hawkes is the traitor, apparently coerced during his captivity by the Mantis. However, Captain Blackwell remains thoroughly unconvinced, and uses his Celareon-retrofitted corvette to shadow Smirnoff's dreadnaught. Listening in under cloak, Blackwell discovers that Smirnoff is the real traitor and that he is trying to eliminate Hawkes. The depth of Smirnoff's treachery is revealed when he destroys his own ship after General Malkor uses the newly acquired wormhole technology to save him from the vessel on self-destruct. Blackwell is able to retrieve Hawkes' prison pod from the ship before it explodes, and the exonerated Admiral returns to service.

It was Admiral Smirnoff who gave the Mantis the plans of Sol's defenses, in the megalomaniacal hope of ruling all mankind as a Mantis proxy following their invasion. As a result, you and your forces find yourselves making a mad rush to defend Earth against the Mantis onslaught.

Admirals Hawkes, Steele, and Takei hold back the assault and soon take the war to Mantis territory. They discover from Warlord Ker'Tak that Malkor, nestled deep in the heart of Mantis space, is building a massive superweapon that is powerful enough to render an entire planet uninhabitable. Once completed, Malkor will go on a rampage with this new weapon and the bulk of the Mantis fleet, launching an unstoppable onslaught against the Rebel Mantis, Terrans, and Celareons.

Thus the race begins to get to Malkor's building site before he can launch this devastating weapon. After a series of furious battles, the combined Rebel/Terran/Celareon fleet manages to break through the Mantis defenses, destroying Malkor's superweapon and Malkor along with it. The cost, however, has been high. Earth herself has been attacked, thousands of Terran warships and several colonies have been destroyed, and mankind's casualties alone rack up in the billions. Ver'Lak still lives, along with two more Warlords Mordalla and Thripid. Celareons themselves have disappeared shortly after victory, erasing all trace of their existence from Terran computers and networks, but the Terrans still left alive haven't forgotten about the Celareon's existence.

== Development ==
Work on Conquest began shortly after the founding of Digital Anvil, with the intent that it be Digital Anvil's debut game. The project was initially headed by Erin Roberts, and Eric Peterson took over while at Digital Anvil, and then at Fever Pitch Studios.

== Reception ==
Reception

Aggregate score
Aggregator	Score
Metacritic	80/100

Review scores
Publication	Score
AllGame	3.5/5
Computer Gaming World	4/5
Eurogamer	7/10
GameRevolution	B
GameSpot	8.2/10
GameSpy	70%
IGN	8.8/10
PC Gamer (US)	76%
PC PowerPlay	85%
PC Zone	82%
The Cincinnati Enquirer	4/5

Conquest: Frontier Wars received "generally favorable reviews" according to the review aggregation website Metacritic. The game won the awards such as IGN Editor's Choice and RTS of the Year.

The game sold around 300,000 copies.

== Canceled sequel ==
Conquest 2: Vyrium Uprising was announced in 2004 as successor to Conquest: Frontier Wars. The developer Warthog Texas (originally known as Fever Pitch Studios) was bought by Tiger Telematics and made to work on games for the ill-fated Gizmondo hand-held game console. The fate of Conquest 2 was unclear after Tiger's subsequent bankruptcy.

In May 2012, the original developers resurfaced to form a Kickstarter campaign. Their aim was to crowdsource the development of the game, which they claimed was about 50% complete. The Kickstarter startup was cancelled on May 30, 2012.
