= Dark Vengeance (video game) =

1998 video game for Windows and Macintosh

- Developer: Reality Bytes
- Publisher: GT Interactive
- Platforms: Microsoft Windows, Macintosh
- Release: NA: December 17, 1998
- Genre: Action
- Modes: Single-player, multiplayer

Dark Vengeance is an action video game developed by Reality Bytes and published by GT Interactive for Windows and Macintosh in 1998.

== Development ==
The game was announced in August 1996 and was showcased at E3 1998. Dark Vengeance used Reality Bytes own 3D engine.

== Reception ==
Reception

Aggregate score
Aggregator	Score
GameRankings	59%

Review scores
Publication	Score
CNET Gamecenter	7/10
Computer Games Strategy Plus	1/5
Computer Gaming World	3.5/5
Game Informer	7.75/10
GamePro	3/5
GameRevolution	C
GameSpot	7/10
IGN	6.8/10
MacLife	4/5 ("Freakin' Awesome")
PC Accelerator	6/10
PC Gamer (US)	49%

The game received mixed reviews according to the review aggregation website GameRankings.
