= Digital Anvil =

American video game company

Digital Anvil, Inc.
- Formerly: Digital Anvil Holdings, Inc. (1996–2001)
- Company type: Subsidiary
- Industry: Video games
- Founded: April 8, 1996; 30 years ago
- Founders: Chris Roberts; Erin Roberts; Tony Zurovec; Marten Davies; Craig Cox; John Miles; Eric Peterson; Robert Rodriguez
- Defunct: January 31, 2006; 20 years ago
- Fate: Dissolved
- Successors: Cloud Imperium Games
- Headquarters: Austin, Texas, U.S.
- Key people: Alan Hartman (studio head)
- Products: Starlancer; Freelancer; Brute Force
- Parent: Microsoft Game Studios (2000–2006)

Digital Anvil, Inc. (formerly Digital Anvil Holdings, Inc.) was an American video game developer based in Austin, Texas owned by Microsoft Game Studios (MGS). It was founded in 1996 by brothers Chris and Erin Roberts along with Tony Zurovec, Marten Davies, Craig Cox, John Miles, Eric Peterson and Robert Rodriguez, creators of the Wing Commander franchise from Origin Systems.

Davies held the position of president of the studio from its founding until February 2000, when his departure was announced. In June 2000, Microsoft started talks to buy Digital Anvil. Roberts admitted that his team required large sums of money, which only a huge company could provide. The acquisition of Digital Anvil by MGS was completed in December of that same year.

== History ==
Digital Anvil was founded in 1996 by Chris Roberts, Erin Roberts, Tony Zurovec, Marten Davies, Craig Cox, John Miles, Eric Peterson, and Robert Rodriguez. The name derived from the team's idea to provide "hard work and high tech". Digital Anvil offered profit-related pay to encourage creative drive and give employees a sense of ownership in the company.

Digital Anvil was purchased by Microsoft in December 2000. One of the consequences of Digital Anvil's purchase was a reshuffling of titles being developed. Conquest: Frontier Wars and Loose Cannon were dropped by the company, eventually being picked up by Ubisoft. Conquest was released in 2001. Many of the Digital Anvil staff working on Loose Cannon were reassigned to the company's flagship Freelancer. Brute Force (still unannounced at the time) was switched from a computer game to an Xbox exclusive. Of all the projects being produced, only Freelancer escaped major change. Co-founder Chris Roberts left the company after the Microsoft takeover, but he still worked as a consultant on Freelancer. Digital Anvil also worked on the visual effects of the 1999 film Wing Commander.

For the next year, Digital Anvil was mostly silent, and many wondered whether any games from the company would see the light of day. Then, in 2001, Digital Anvil revealed a lighter Freelancer to the press. Although some of the more ambitious elements were dropped, this act proved Freelancer was not vaporware. In March 2003, Freelancer was released and immediately became one of the month's top-selling games. In May of the same year, Digital Anvil released Brute Force for the Xbox. The game also did quite well, setting first-month sales records for Xbox games. In November 2005, Microsoft redeployed the developer's employees to its Microsoft Studios headquarters. Digital Anvil was officially dissolved on January 31, 2006.

Hartman, the studio head of Digital Anvil at the time of its closure, was moved from Austin to Redmond as head of Turn 10 Studios, authors of the Forza Motorsport franchise.

== Games ==
Year	Title	Platforms
2000	Starlancer	Windows, Dreamcast
2003	Freelancer	Windows
2003	Brute Force	Xbox
