= Comparison of digital audio editors =

The following tables compare general and technical information among a number of digital audio editors and multitrack recording software.

(Note: HP-UX, IBM-DB2U, FreeBSD and other Unixes omitted)

== Digital Audio Workstations ==
Basic general information about the software: creator/company, license/price etc.

Digital audio editor	Creator / developer	Software license	Microsoft Windows	MacOS	Linux	iOS	Android	Network storage	External hardware
ACID Pro	Boris FX	Proprietary	Yes	No	No	No			
Ardour	The Ardour Community	GNU GPL (Pay-what-you-want)	Yes	Yes	Yes	No		NFS	
AudioDesk	Mark of the Unicorn	Proprietary	No	Yes	No	No			
Audition	Adobe Systems	Proprietary	Yes	Yes	No	No			
BandLab	BandLab Technologies	Proprietary (Freeware)	Yes	Yes	Yes	Yes	Yes		
Bitwig Studio	Bitwig	Proprietary	Yes	Yes	Yes	No			
Cakewalk by BandLab	BandLab Technologies	Proprietary	Yes	No	No	No	No		
Cubase	Steinberg	Proprietary	Yes	Yes	No	Yes, as Cubasis	Yes, as Cubasis		
Digital Performer	Mark of the Unicorn	Proprietary	Yes	Yes	No	No			
Fairlight	Blackmagic Design	Proprietary Freeware	Yes	Yes	Yes				
FL Studio	Image-Line	Proprietary	Yes	Yes	No	Yes	Yes		
GarageBand	Apple	Proprietary	No	Yes	No	Yes			
Harrison Mixbus	Harrison Consoles	Proprietary	Yes	Yes	Yes	No		NFS	
Kristal	Kreatives	Proprietary (Freeware)	Yes	No	No	No			
Live	Ableton	Proprietary	Yes	Yes	No	No			
LMMS	Tobias Doerffel	GNU GPL	Yes	Yes	Yes	No		NFS	
Logic Pro	Apple	Proprietary	Discontinued (last version: 5.5.1)	Yes	No	Yes, iPad only			
Magix Music Maker	Magix	Proprietary / Freemium	Yes	No	No	No			
Mixcraft	Acoustica	Proprietary	Yes	No	Wine	Remote only	Remote only		
mp3DirectCut	Martin Pesch	Proprietary Freeware	Yes	No	No	No			
MuLab	MuTools	Proprietary	Yes	Yes	No	No			
MultitrackStudio	Bremmers Audio Design	Proprietary	Yes	Yes	No	Yes			
MusE	MuseE	GNU GPL	No	No	Yes	No		NFS	
n-Track	n-Track Software	Proprietary	Yes	Yes	Yes	Yes	Yes		
Nuendo	Steinberg	Proprietary	Yes	Yes	No	No			
Podium	Zynewave	Proprietary / Freemium	Yes	No	No	No			
Pro Tools	Avid	Proprietary	Yes	Yes	No	No		MediaNet (proprietary)	Yes
Qtractor	Qtractor	GNU GPL	No	No	Yes	No		NFS	
REAPER	Cockos	Proprietary	Yes	Yes	Yes (after version 6.0)	No			
Reason	Propellerhead Software	Proprietary	Yes	Yes	No	No			
Record	Propellerhead Software	Proprietary	Yes	Yes	No	No			
Renoise	Renoise Team	Proprietary	Yes	Yes	Yes	No			
Rosegarden	Rosegarden	GNU GPL	No	No	Yes	No		NFS	
Samplitude/Sequoia	Magix	Proprietary	Yes	No	No	No			
Soundscape 32	Mackie	Proprietary	Yes	No	No	No			External 2U rack unit
Studio Pro	Fender, PreSonus	Proprietary	Yes	Yes	Yes	No		SoundCloud	
Waveform	Tracktion Software Corporation	Proprietary	Yes	Yes	Yes	No			
Digital audio editor	Creator / developer	Software license	Microsoft Windows	MacOS	Linux	iOS	Android	Network storage	External hardware

== Wave editors ==
Basic general information about the software: creator/company, license/price etc.

Digital audio editor	Creator / developer	Software license	Microsoft Windows	MacOS	iOS	Linux	BSD	Online	Network storage	External hardware
Acoustica	Acon Digital	Proprietary	Yes	Yes	No	No	No	No	Unknown	Unknown
Audacity	Audacity Team	GNU GPLv2	Yes	Yes	No	Yes	Yes	No	NFS	
Audiotool	Hobnox	Proprietary	Yes	Yes	Not officially supported	Yes	No	Yes	NFS	Optional MIDI support
BIAS Peak	BIAS	Proprietary	No	Yes	No	No	No	No		
Diamond Cut ART	Diamond Cut Productions	Proprietary	Yes	No	No	No	No	No	Unknown	Unknown
Ecasound	Kai Vehmanen	GNU GPL	No	Yes	No	Yes	Yes	No	Unknown	Unknown
Goldwave	Goldwave Inc.	Proprietary Shareware	Yes	No	No	No	No	Yes		
Jokosher	Jokosher	GNU GPL	Yes	No	No	Yes	No	No	NFS	
NU-Tech	Leaff Engineering	Proprietary	Yes	No	No	No	No	No		
RiffWorks	Sonoma Wire Works	Proprietary	Yes	Yes	No	No	No	No		
Sound Forge	Magix	Proprietary	Yes	Discontinued (last version: 3)	No	No	No	No		
Soundbooth	Adobe Systems	Proprietary	Yes	Yes	No	No	No	No		
SoX	Chris Bagwell, et al.	GNU GPL	Yes	Yes	No	Yes	Yes	No		
SpectraLayers	Steinberg	Proprietary	Yes	Yes	No	No	No	No		
Sweep	Conrad Parker	GNU GPL	No	No	No	Yes	Yes	No		
Total Recorder	HighCriteria	Proprietary Shareware	Yes	No	No	No	No	No		
WaveLab	Steinberg	Proprietary	Yes	Yes	No	No	No	No		External gear, MIDI
WavePad	NCH Software	Proprietary / Freemium	Yes	Yes	Yes	No	No	No		
WaveSurfer	Centre for Speech Technology at KTH	BSD-like	Yes	Yes	No	Yes	Yes	No		
Digital audio editor	Creator / developer	Software license	Microsoft Windows	MacOS	iOS	Linux	BSD	Online	Network storage	External hardware

== Support ==
=== Plugin support ===
The plugin types that the software can run natively (without emulation).

	ReWire	JACK	VST	VST3	LADSPA	LV2	DSSI	RTAS	AU	DXi	MAS
ACID Pro	Yes	No	Yes	Yes	No	No	No	No	No	Yes	No
Acoustica	No	No	Yes	Yes	No	No	No	No	Yes	No	No
Ardour	No	Yes	Yes	Yes	Yes	Yes	No	No	Yes	No	No
Audacity	No	Yes	Yes	Yes (3.2.0 and newer)	Yes	Yes	No	No	Only on OS X	No	No
AudioDesk	Returns only	No	Via converter	No	No	No	No	No	Yes	No	Yes
Audiotool	No	No	No	No	No	No	No	No	No	No	No
Audition	Partial (Pre CS5.5 - Yes, CS5.5 - No)	Yes	Yes	Yes	No	No	No	No	Yes	Partial (Pre CS5.5 - Yes, CS5.5 - No)	No
BIAS Peak	Unknown	Unknown	Unknown	Unknown	Unknown	Unknown	Unknown	Unknown	Unknown	Unknown	Unknown
Bitwig Studio	No	Yes	Yes	Yes	No	No	No	No	No	No	No
Cakewalk by BandLab	Yes	No	Yes	Yes	No	No	No	No	No	Yes	No
Cubase	Yes	No	Yes	Yes	No	No	No	No	No	Terminated (SX3.1)	No
Diamond Cut ART	Unknown	Unknown	Unknown	Unknown	Unknown	Unknown	Unknown	Unknown	Unknown	Unknown	Unknown
Digital Performer	Yes	No	Yes	Yes	No	No	No	Yes (with Digi TDM or HD hardware via DAE)	Yes	No	Yes
Ecasound	No	Yes	No	No	Yes	No	No	No	No	No	No
FL Studio	Yes	No	Yes	Yes	No	No	No	No	Yes	Yes	No
GarageBand	Yes	No	No	No	No	No	No	No	Yes	No	No
Goldwave	No	No	Beta	Unknown	No	No	No	No	No	Yes	No
	ReWire	JACK	VST	VST3	LADSPA	LV2	DSSI	RTAS	AU	DXi	MAS
Harrison Mixbus	No	Yes	Yes	Yes	Yes	Yes	No	No	Yes	No	No
Jokosher	No	No	No	Unknown	Yes	No	No	No	No	No	No
Kristal	Unknown	Unknown	Unknown	Unknown	Unknown	Unknown	Unknown	Unknown	Unknown	Unknown	Unknown
Live	Yes	No	Yes	Yes (Live 10.1 and newer)	No	No	No	No	Yes	No	No
LMMS	No	Yes	Yes	Unknown	Yes	No	No	No	No	No	No
Logic Express/Studio	Yes	No	No	No	No	No	No	No	Yes	No	No
Mixcraft	Yes	No	Yes	Yes	No	No	No	No	No	DirectX effects only	No
mp3DirectCut	No	No	No	No	No	No	No	No	No	No	No
MuLab	Yes	Unknown	Yes	No	No	No	No	No	No	No	No
MusE	No	Yes	Yes	Unknown	Yes	Yes	Yes	No	No	No	No
n-Track	Yes	No	Yes	Yes	No	No	No	No	Yes	Yes	No
Nuendo	Yes	No	Yes	Yes	No	No	No	No	No	No	No
NU-Tech	No	No	Yes	Unknown	No	No	No	No	No	No	No
Podium	Yes	No	Yes	No	No	No	No	No	No	No	No
Pro Tools	Yes	No	No	No	No	No	No	Before version 11	No	No	No
Qtractor	No	Yes	Yes	Yes	Yes	Yes	Yes	No	Yes	No	No
	ReWire	JACK	VST	VST3	LADSPA	LV2	DSSI	RTAS	AU	DXi	MAS
REAPER	Yes	Yes	Yes	Yes	No	Yes	No	No	Yes	Yes	No
Reason	Yes	No	Yes	Yes	No	No	No	No	No	No	No
Record	Yes	No	No	No	No	No	No	No	No	No	No
Renoise	Yes	Yes	Yes	Yes	Yes	No	Yes	No	Yes	No	No
RiffWorks	Yes	No	Yes	Unknown	No	No	No	No	Yes	No	No
Rosegarden	No	Yes	No	No	Yes	No	Yes	No	No	No	No
Samplitude	Yes	No	Yes	Yes	No	No	No	No	No	Yes	No
Sound Forge	No	No	Yes	Unknown	No	No	No	No	Yes	Yes	No
Soundbooth	Unknown	Unknown	Unknown	Unknown	Unknown	Unknown	Unknown	Unknown	Unknown	Unknown	Unknown
Soundscape 32	Unknown	Unknown	Unknown	Unknown	Unknown	Unknown	Unknown	Unknown	Unknown	Unknown	Unknown
SoX	No	No	No	No	Yes	No	No	No	No	No	No
SpectraLayers	No	No	Yes	Unknown	No	No	No	No	No	No	No
Studio One	Yes	No	Yes	Yes	No	No	No	No	Yes	No	No
Sweep	No	No	No	No	Yes	No	No	No	No	No	No
Total Recorder	No	No	No	No	No	No	No	No	No	No	No
Waveform	Yes	Yes	Yes	Yes	Yes	No	No	No	Yes	No	No
WaveLab	No	No	Yes	Yes	No	No	No	No	No	No	No
WavePad	No	No	Yes	No	No	No	No	No	No	Yes	No
WaveSurfer	No	No	No	No	No	No	No	No	No	No	No
	ReWire	JACK	VST	VST3	LADSPA	LV2	DSSI	RTAS	AU	DXi	MAS

=== File format support ===
The various file types the software can read/write.

	OMF	AAF	MIDI	WAV	MP3	AAC	Ogg	REX2	AIFF	FLAC	Others
Acoustica	No	No	No	Yes	Yes	Yes	Yes	No	Yes	Yes	W64
Ardour	No	No	Yes	Yes	Yes	No	Yes	Unknown	Yes	Yes	W64, libsndfile library formats
Audacity	No	No	No	Yes	Yes	Yes	Yes	No	Yes	Yes	AMR
AudioDesk	Yes	Yes	Yes	Yes	Yes	No	No	Yes	Yes	No	SDII (native)
Audiotool	No	No	No	Import	Export	No	Export	No	No	No	
Audition	Yes	Unknown	No (unsupported since CS5)	Yes	Yes	Yes	Yes	No	Yes	Yes	AU, IFF, RAW/PCM, SMP, VOC, VOX, WMA
BIAS Peak	Unknown	Unknown	Unknown	Unknown	Unknown	Unknown	Unknown	Unknown	Unknown	Unknown	Unknown
Bitwig Studio	No	No	Yes	Yes	Yes	Yes	Yes	No	Yes	Yes	WMA
Cakewalk by BandLab	Yes	No	Yes	Yes	Yes	Import	Yes	Yes	Yes	Yes	W64, CAF, SDII, AU, SND, DSF, DFF, RCY, ASF, WMA, WMV
Cubase	Yes	Yes	Yes	Yes	Yes	No	Yes	Yes	Yes	Yes	WMA, W64
Diamond Cut ART	Unknown	Unknown	Unknown	Unknown	Unknown	Unknown	Unknown	Unknown	Unknown	Unknown	Unknown
Digital Performer	Yes	Yes	Yes	Yes	Yes	No	No	Yes	Yes	No	SDII (native)
Ecasound	Unknown	Unknown	Unknown	Unknown	Unknown	Unknown	Unknown	Unknown	Unknown	Unknown	Unknown
FL Studio	No	No	Yes	Yes	Yes	Yes	Yes	Yes	Import	Yes	XI, REX
GarageBand	No	No	Yes (Note: Import only, Version 2 or higher.)	Yes	Yes	Yes	Unknown	Unknown	No	No	
Goldwave	Unknown	Unknown	Unknown	Yes	Yes	Unknown	Yes	Unknown	Yes	Yes	Windows Media Audio, AU, Monkey's Audio, VOX, mat, snd, voc
Harrison Mixbus	No	No	Yes	Yes	Unknown	Unknown	Yes	Unknown	No	Yes	AIFC, NeXT AU/SND, Headerless RAW, PAF, IFF/SVX, Sphere Nist WAV, IRCAM SF, VOC, W64, MAT4, MAT5, PVF, Fasttracker 2 XI, HMM Tool Kit HTK, CAF, SD2
	OMF	AAF	MIDI	WAV	MP3	AAC	Ogg	REX2	AIFF	FLAC	Others
Jokosher	No	No	No	Yes	Yes	Unknown	Yes	Unknown	Unknown	Unknown	
Kristal	Unknown	Unknown	Unknown	Unknown	Unknown	Unknown	Unknown	Unknown	Unknown	Unknown	Unknown
Live	No	No	Yes	Yes	Yes	Yes	Yes	Yes	Yes	Yes	SDII (Mac OS X Only)
LMMS	Unknown	Unknown	Yes	Yes	Yes	Unknown	Yes	Unknown	Yes	Yes	AU, DS, RAW, SPX, VOC. Can also open .flp files
Logic Pro	Partial	Yes	Yes	Yes	Yes	Yes	Unknown	Yes	Yes	Yes	
Mixcraft	No	No	Yes	Yes	Yes	No	Yes	No	Yes	Yes	
mp3DirectCut	No	No	No	No	Yes	No	No	No	No	No	
MuLab	No	No	Yes	Yes	Yes	No	Yes	Yes	Yes	No	
MusE	Unknown	Unknown	Unknown	Unknown	Unknown	Unknown	Unknown	Unknown	Unknown	Unknown	Unknown
N-Track	Yes	Yes	Yes	Yes	Yes	No	Yes	No	Yes	Yes	WMA, EDL, WAV64
Nuendo	Yes	Yes	Yes	Yes	Yes	Yes	Yes	Yes	Yes	No	
NU-Tech	Unknown	Unknown	Unknown	Unknown	Unknown	Unknown	Unknown	Unknown	Unknown	Unknown	Unknown
Podium	Unknown	Unknown	Unknown	Unknown	Unknown	Unknown	Unknown	Unknown	Unknown	Unknown	Unknown
Pro Tools	Yes (Note: With DV Toolkit or DigiTranslator add-ons.)	Yes	Yes	Yes	Yes	Import	Import	Yes (7.4)	Yes	No	SDII (Mac OS X Only)
Qtractor	No	No	Yes	Yes	Yes	No	Yes	No	Yes	Yes	CAF, HTK, IFF/8SVX, MAT4/5, PAF, PVF, RAW, SDII, SDS, SF, VOC, W64, XI
REAPER	Partial	No	Yes	Yes	Yes	Partial	Yes	Yes	Yes	Yes	APE, BWF, MOOG, W64, WavPack
Reason	No	No	Yes	Yes	Import	Import	No	Yes	Yes	No	SF2, ReFill
Record	No	No	Yes	Yes	No	No	No	Yes	Yes	No	SF2, ReFill
	OMF	AAF	MIDI	WAV	MP3	AAC	Ogg	REX2	AIFF	FLAC	Others
Renoise	No	No	Yes	Yes	Yes	No	Yes	No	Yes	Yes	MP4, MP4A, CAF, SFZ
RiffWorks	No	No	No	Export	No	No	Export	Yes	No	No	
Rosegarden	No	No	Yes	Yes	Import	Unknown	Import	Unknown	Unknown	Import	Csound, Mup, MuxicXML, h2song
Samplitude	Yes	Yes	Yes	Yes	Yes	Yes	Yes	No	Yes	Yes	WMA, RealAudio
Sound Forge	Unknown	Unknown	Unknown	Yes	Yes	Yes	Yes	Unknown	Yes	Yes	SWF (open only), RealAudio & RealVideo (export only), WMA and WMV, AVI, AIF, SND, MPEG-1 and MPEG-2, AU, DIG, IVC, PCA, W64, FRG, VOX, AA3, OMA, CDA, AC-3 studio (save only), RAW
Soundbooth	Unknown	Unknown	Unknown	Unknown	Unknown	Unknown	Unknown	Unknown	Unknown	Unknown	Unknown
Soundscape 32	Unknown	Unknown	Unknown	Unknown	Unknown	Unknown	Unknown	Unknown	Unknown	Unknown	Unknown
SoX	Unknown	Unknown	Unknown	Yes	External LAME	Unknown	Yes	Unknown	Yes	Yes	AU and other audio file formats
SpectraLayers	Unknown	Unknown	Unknown	Yes	Yes	Yes	Yes	Unknown	Yes	Yes	.caf, .alac, RAW/PCM, .rm, .au, .snd, AVI, MXF, MP1, MP2, MP4, MKV, Quicktime, .vob, .wmv, WMA
Studio One	No	Yes	Yes	Yes	Yes	No	Yes	Yes	Yes	Yes	OpenTL, BWF, RF64, PreSonus Capture Session, Steinberg Cubase Track Archive, Steinberg Sequel Project, Kristal Audio Engine Project
Sweep	No	No	No	Yes	Yes	No	Yes	No	Yes	Yes	Various versions of WAV (integer, floating point, GSM, and compressed formats); Microsoft PCM, A-law and u-law formats; AIFC and RIFX; various AU/SND formats (Sun/NeXT, Dec AU, G721 and G723 ADPCM); RAW header-less PCM files; Amiga IFF/8SVX/16SV PCM files; Ensoniq PARIS (.PAF); Apple's Core Audio Format (CAF) and others.
Total Recorder	No	No	No	No	Yes	No	Yes	No	No	Yes	PCM (uncompressed), WMA, Monkey's Audio (APE).
Waveform	No	Yes	Yes	Yes	Yes	Yes	Yes	Yes	Yes	Yes	
WaveLab	No	No	Controllers	Yes	Yes	Yes	Yes	No	Yes	Yes	AU, MP2, RAW
WavePad	No	No	Import	Yes	Yes	Yes	Yes	No	Yes	Yes	import midi, Sun AU, MPEG4 audio, GSM, RAW, Dialogic VOX, AMR Narrowband, Musepack, Monkey's Audio Codec, others
WaveSurfer	No	No	No	Yes	Import	No	With plugin	No	Yes	No	Import: AU, CSL, SD; Export: AU
	OMF	AAF	MIDI	WAV	MP3	AAC	Ogg	REX2	AIFF	FLAC	Others

== See also ==
- List of music software
