= Audio Random Access =

Extension for audio plug-in interface

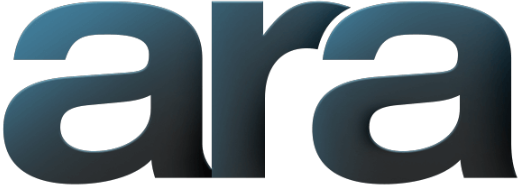
- Developers: Celemony Software, PreSonus
- Release: October 2011; 15 years ago
- Type: Audio Plug-In Interface Extension

Audio Random Access (commonly abbreviated to ARA) is an extension for audio plug-in interfaces, such as AU, VST and RTAS, allowing them to exchange a greater amount of audio information with digital audio workstation (DAW) software. It was developed in a collaboration between Celemony Software and PreSonus.

== Functionality ==
ARA increases the amount of communication possible between DAW software and a plug-in, allowing them to exchange important information, such as audio data, tempo, pitch, and rhythm, for an entire song, rather than just at the moment of playback.

This increased amount of information exchange, and availability of data from other points in time, removes the need for audio material to be transferred to and from the plug-in, allowing that plug-in to be used as a more closely integrated part of the DAW's overall interface.

== History ==
ARA was developed as a joint effort between Celemony Software and PreSonus, driven by the desire to increase the level of integration between Celemony's Melodyne plug-in and the DAWs using it. It was first published in October 2011 and released as part of PreSonus' Studio One DAW (version 2) and Melodyne (Editor, Assistant and Essential versions 1.3).

Version 2 of ARA was announced during the NAMM Show in January 2018, introducing new features such as the simultaneous editing of multiple tracks, transfer of chord track information, and undo synchronization with the DAW. DAWs which use ARA version 2 are not automatically backwards compatible with plug-ins using version 1. The first DAWs to support ARA version 2 were Logic Pro X (version 10.4, released in January 2018) and Studio One (version 4, released in May 2018).

== ARA implementation ==
To allow software manufacturers to support ARA, a Software Development Kit has been published by Celemony.

Current software products which support ARA include the following.

=== Digital audio workstations ===
DAW	Developer	ARA v1 Support	ARA v2 Support
ACID Pro Next	MAGIX	N/A	Version 1.0.3.32 or later
Cakewalk by BandLab	BandLab Technologies	SONAR X3 or later	Version 2019.05 or later
Cubase	Steinberg	N/A	Version 10.0.30 or later
Digital Performer	MOTU	N/A	Version 11.2 or later
Live	Ableton	N/A	Version 13 or later
Logic Pro X	Apple Inc.	N/A	Version 10.4 or later; Intel or Apple Silicon with Rosetta only as of 2025
LUNA	Universal Audio	N/A	Version 2.0 or later
Nuendo	Steinberg	N/A	Version 10.1 or later
Pro Tools	Avid Technology, Inc.	N/A	Version 2022.9 or later
REAPER	Cockos	N/A	Version 5.97 or later
Samplitude Pro	Magix	Version X3 or later	Version X5 or later
Studio Pro	Fender,PreSonus	Version 2 or later	Version 4 or later
Waveform / Tracktion	Tracktion Software Corporation	Version 5 or later	N/A

=== Audio editors and plug-ins ===
Plug-In	Developer	ARA v1 Support	ARA v2 Support
Melodyne	Celemony Software	Version 1.3 or later	Version 4.2 or later
VocAlign	Synchro Arts	Project version 3 / Pro version 4 or later	Project version 3.6.0.5 / Pro version 4.5.0.5 or later
RePitch	Synchro Arts	N/A	Version 1
Revoice Pro	Synchro Arts	N/A	Version 4 or later
SpectraLayers	Steinberg	N/A	Version 6 or later
WaveLab	Steinberg		
Auto-Align Post 2	Sound Radix	N/A	Version 1
Acoustica	Acon Digital	N/A	Version 7.4 or later
ASAP - Spectral Surface	IRCAM	N/A	All versions
ASAP - Pitches Brew	IRCAM	N/A	All versions
ASAP - Stretch Life	IRCAM	N/A	All versions
Vocaloid	Yamaha	N/A	Version 6 or later
Synthesizer V Studio	Dreamtonics	N/A	Version 1.11.0 or later
VOIS (getVOIS)	VOIS	N/A	Version 1.1.9 or later
Sync VX	Waves	N/A	
DynAssist	NoiseWorks Audio	N/A	
Vovious	Vovious	N/A	

== See also ==
- Celemony Software
- PreSonus
- Studio Pro
- Audio plug-in
