= ReWire (software protocol) =

Protocol for digital audio workstation

ReWire is a software protocol, jointly developed by Propellerhead and Steinberg, allowing remote control and data transfer among digital audio editing and related software. Originally appearing in the ReBirth software synthesizer in 1998, the protocol has since evolved into an industry standard.

Reason Studios has announced that they have discontinued ReWire as of version 11 of Reason. Renoise dropped support for ReWire in version 3.5.

Currently used in macOS and Microsoft Windows 32-bit or 64-bit audio applications, ReWire enables the simultaneous transfer of up to 256 audio tracks of arbitrary resolution and 4080 channels of MIDI data. This allows, for example, the output from synthesizer software to be fed directly into a linear editor without the use of intermediate files or analog transfers. There are also provisions to remotely trigger actions, such as starting and stopping recording. The protocol is licensed free of charge to companies only, but comes with a "non-disclosure of source code" license that is incompatible with most free-software licenses.

The ReWire system consists of "Hosts", "Panels", and "Devices". Hosts are the host applications which typically do the sequencing at one end and the final mixdown at the other end. A Device is a dynamic link library that only generates sound; it has no user interface. A Panel is a graphical interface for setting the parameters of one Device. A typical setup would be to use Ableton Live in "Host" mode, and use Propellerhead Reason as a synthesizer. In this case Reason would provide Device/Panel pairs to Ableton, which could then send MIDI commands, sync timing and mix Reason's output into its own effects chains. Many applications support either mode. In fact, an application could (at the discretion of a developer) act as both a Host and a Panel at the same time.

== ReWire Hosts ("Sequencers/Trackers") ==
- Ableton Live
- ACID Pro
- Adobe Audition
- Cakewalk Sonar / Cakewalk by BandLab
- Cycling '74 Max/MSP
- FL Studio
- GarageBand
- Jeskola Buzz (with plugin.)
- Logic Pro
- MOTU Digital Performer
- MU.LAB
- Notion
- Pro Tools
- REAPER
- Samplitude
- Sonoma Wire Works RiffWorks
- Steinberg Cubase
- Steinberg Nuendo
- Studio One
- Synapse Audio Orion Platinum
- Tracktion

== ReWire Devices ("Synthesizers") ==
- Ableton Live
- ACID Pro
- Arturia Storm
- Cakewalk Project 5
- Cycling '74 Max/MSP
- Finale (beginning in v.25)
- FL Studio
- REAPER
- ReBirth RB-338
- Record
- Renoise
- Sibelius (beginning in v.6)
- Vocaloid
- Vocaloid 2

== See also ==
- JACK — a similar, open source API for Linux, macOS and Windows.
