= AudioGaming =

French company

- Company type: Limited liability company
- Industry: Computer software and Sound Design
- Founded: Paris, France (2009)
- Headquarters: Toulouse, France
- Products: AudioWind, AudioRain, AudioMotors
- Number of employees: 5
- Website: AudioGaming.net

AudioGaming is a French company developing procedural audio tools dedicated to sound designers and video game developers. It was founded in 2009 by Amaury La Burthe, Damien Henry & Guilllaume Le Nost.

== Audio tools ==
Their first VST/RTAS/AU plugins "AudioWind" and "AudioRain" were released in June 2012. The wind sound synthesis plug-in AudioWind was successfully used for ambient sounds in Quentin Tarantino's Django Unchained.

Their next product "AudioMotors", more oriented toward re-recording engineers, is an audio plug-in dedicated to vehicle engine sound synthesis. It can be used in such applications as a car chase soundtrack creation. Also aiming for post-production, another product was announced in April 2013, "AudioSteps". It includes a large footsteps library as well as manipulation tools to ease shaping them to the actual dubbed scene and/or to any sound design choices.

== Sound design for video games ==
The company also takes part in first-hand video game development: in a partnership with French editor Bulkypix and developer Dogbox, the game Journey to Hell was created and released in March 2013.

In October 2013, the French platform game Type:Rider was released, with its soundtrack entirely designed by AudioGaming.
