= Inter-App Audio =

Deprecated technology by Apple

Inter-App Audio (IAA) is a deprecated technology developed by Apple Inc. which routes audio and MIDI signals between applications on the iOS mobile operating system. The technology was introduced in 2013 in iOS 7 and deprecated in 2019 with the release of iOS 13.

Inter-App Audio Block Diagram

== Scope ==
Inter-App Audio is a host-plugin technology. An IAA host application connects to a node application to send and receive audio, MIDI, timeline information, and other signals.

== Node applications ==
Node applications can be of the following types:

- Instruments (can receive MIDI signals and produce audio signals)
- Generators (can produce audio signals)
- Effects (can receive, transform and send back audio signals)

== Limitations ==
At the moment, audio signal routing is only possible with a sampling rate of 44.1 kHz.

== Deprecation ==
Inter-App Audio was deprecated in 2019 with the release of iOS 13 in favor of the third version of Audio Units.

== Competing technologies ==
- Audiobus
- Audio Units
- Ableton Link
