= Rosegarden =

Digital audio workstation program

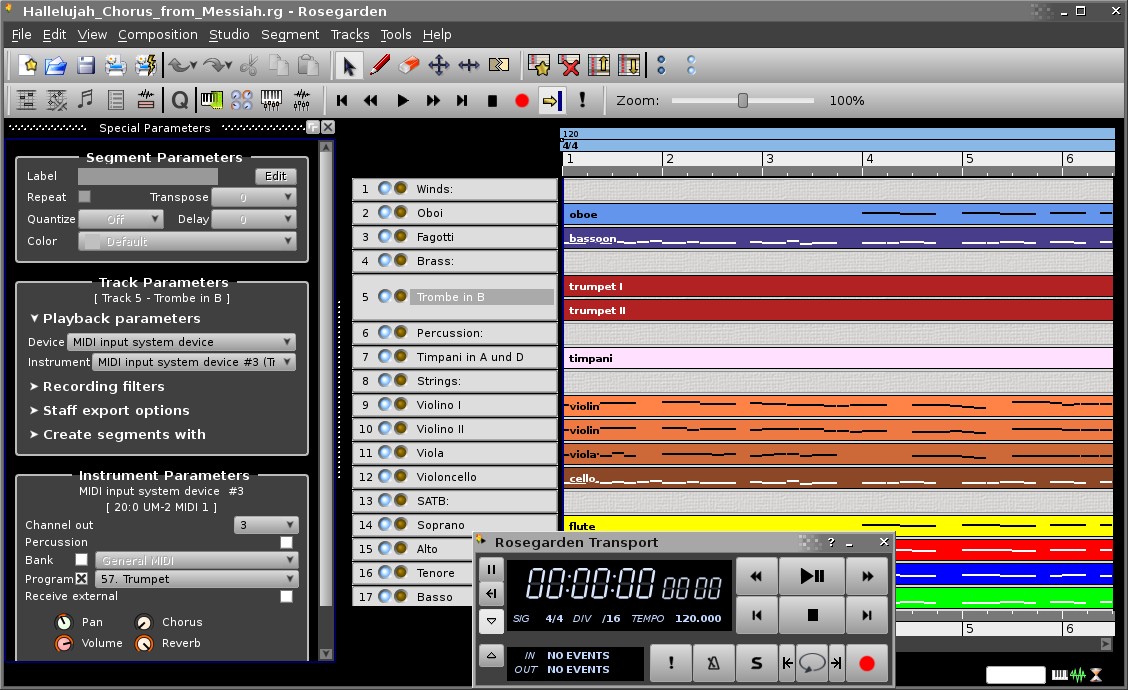
- Rosegarden 10.02.1 screenshot
- Developers: Chris Cannam, Richard Bown, Guillaume Laurent, et al.
- Stable release: 25.12 / 3 December 2025
- Written in: C++
- Operating system: BSD, Linux
- Type: Digital audio workstation
- License: GPL-2.0-or-later
- Website: rosegardenmusic.com
- Repository: sourceforge.net/projects/rosegarden/

Rosegarden is a free software digital audio workstation program developed for Linux with ALSA, JACK and Qt. It acts as an audio and MIDI sequencer, scorewriter, and musical composition and editing tool. It is intended to be a free alternative to such applications as Cubase.

Software synthesizers are available as a plugin, and it is possible to use external MIDI synthesizer, hardware or software (such as FluidSynth, TiMidity++ or Yoshimi) in order to make any sound from MIDI compositions. Recent versions of Rosegarden support the DSSI software synthesizer plugin interface and can use some Windows VST plugins through an adapter. As of version 24.12 LV2 plugin beta support is provided. Connection to software synths is provided via ALSA MIDI.

== History ==
The current Rosegarden program was originally named Rosegarden-4, to distinguish it from a previous program by the same authors called Rosegarden 2.1, which is now known as X11 Rosegarden. X11 Rosegarden is very limited but is stable on a wide variety of Unix-like operating systems and other platforms such as OpenVMS. In contrast, because Rosegarden(-4) uses the Linux ALSA system, it only runs in a very limited manner on non-Linux systems.

The Rosegarden project was started in 1993 at the University of Bath. Rosegarden 2.1 (X11 Rosegarden) was released under the GPL in 1997; Rosegarden(-4) began in April 2000. Version 1.0 was released on February 14, 2005, and version 1.2.4 on July 14, 2006. In 2010, The version numbering was changed to reflect the release year, starting with 10.02.

== Developers ==
Rosegarden was developed up through 1.0 by Chris Cannam, Richard Bown and Guillaume Laurent. Since then, each release has been developed by a different mix of core and contributing project members, including, but not limited to D. Michael McIntyre, Pedro Lopez-Cabanillas, and Heikki Junes. Bown has retired from the project, while Laurent has left to pursue his interest in porting to Mac OS X via Cocoa in an as yet unnamed spinoff project. As of 2023 Ted Felix has been leading development and releases with substantial support from Philip Leishman and other contributors.

== Features ==
- MIDI and audio playback and recording with ALSA and JACK
- Piano-roll (Matrix), score, event list and track overview editors
- DSSI synth and audio effects plugin support, including Windows VST effects and instrument support via dssi-vst
- LADSPA audio effects plugin support
- JACK transport support for synchronisation with other software
- Ability to build and run without JACK, for MIDI-only use
- Score interpretation of performance MIDI data
- Shareable device (.rgd) files to ease MIDI portability
- Triggered segments for pattern sequencing & performable ornaments
- Audio and MIDI mixers
- MIDI and Hydrogen file import
- MIDI, Csound, LilyPond and MusicXML file export (including PostScript and PDF output file generation of score)
- User interface translations for Russian, Spanish, German, French, Welsh, Italian, Swedish, Estonian, Japanese, Simplified Chinese, Dutch, Polish, Czech, Catalan, and Finnish, as well as UK and US English
- Help documentation available substantially or entirely translated into German, Swedish and Japanese as well as English

== See also ==
- Free audio software
- Linux audio software
- GNU LilyPond
- MusE
- MuseScore
- Hydrogen
- Ardour
- NoteEdit
- List of music software
