= Celemony Software =

German musical software company

- Type: GmbH
- Industry: Audio/Music
- Founded: October 2000
- Headquarters: Munich, Germany
- Area served: Digital audio processing
- Key people: Peter Neubäcker, Carsten Gehle, Anselm Roessler
- Products: Melodyne, Capstan
- Number of employees: > 20 (as of 2012)
- Website: celemony.com

Celemony Software GmbH is a German musical software company that specializes in digital audio pitch correction software. It produces Melodyne, a popular audio pitch modification tool similar to AutoTune, although the program itself is manual tuning software.

== History ==
Celemony was founded in October 2000 by Peter Neubäcker, Prof. Dr. Hildegard Sourgens and Carsten Gehle. It is based in Munich, Germany.

In 2009, Melodyne won an MIPA Award for Most innovative product for its Direct Note Access (DNA). In 2011, Celemony released Capstan, a stand-alone audio restoration software that eliminates wow and flutter from digital recordings.

In October 2011, Celemony and PreSonus introduced Audio Random Access (ARA), an extension for audio plug-in formats like AU and VST that permits to exchange data between them which is supported by several DAWs. It is now under an open source license and they also released a comprehensive software development kit (SDK).

Celemony received a Special Merit/Technical Grammy Award at the 54th Grammy Awards in February 2012 for "contributions of outstanding technical significance to the recording field."

== Products ==
Melodyne logo

=== Melodyne ===
Three years before Celemony was founded, Peter Neubäcker was working on a research experiment with sound. This experiment later turned into the Melodyne pitch correction product.

Melodyne has become a tool which is used by a large number of professional record producers worldwide to tune and manipulate audio signals, typically a singer's vocals.

Melodyne also has facilities for time-stretching and rebuilding melodies. It can also be used to aid the creation of backing vocals from an existing lead vocal. The first public viewing of Melodyne was at the Winter NAMM Show in 2001, and it has since won various awards.

As of May 2020, the current release is Melodyne 5, which can correct the intonation on vocal tracks. The algorithm now detects the presence and extent of the unpitched (noise-like) components of the vocal sound as well as breaths, which it then processes separately from the pitched components. The volume balance between the pitched and unpitched components can be adjusted. New possibilities for dynamic contouring are afforded by the Fade Tool and the Leveling Macro, as they too work on a per-note basis, even with polyphonic audio material. With the Chord Track (and the Pitch Grid configured accordingly), recordings and samples can be adapted to the harmonic structure and chords of songs.

Artists who use the software include Herbie Hancock, Björk, Coldplay, Peter Gabriel and Thomas Newman. It is also used in classical music for the pitch analysis of speech. Composer Jonathan Harvey and IRCAM engineers used Melodyne to extract melodic material for his composition Speakings.

=== Capstan ===
Capstan is a program for eliminating wow and flutter from recordings.

== Technologies ==
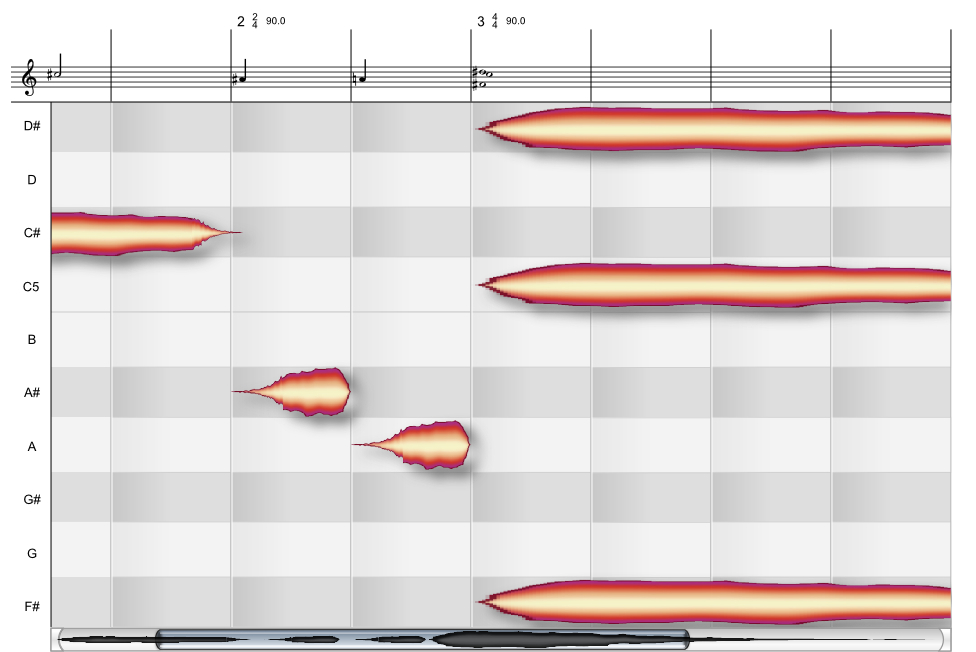
Schematic of polyphonic note separation & manipulation

=== Direct Note Access (DNA) ===
DNA Direct Note Access™ allows individual notes in a polyphonic melody to be identified and edited, unlike Melodyne™ which does the same for notes in monophonic ones.

=== Audio Random Access (ARA) ===
ARA Audio Random Access™ enables exchange of information for an audio file's tempo, pitch, rhythm, etc. between supporting DAWs and plug-ins.

== See also ==
- Audio Random Access
- Audio time stretching and pitch scaling
- Dynamic tonality – the real-time changes of tuning and timbre for new chord progressions, musical temperament modulations, etc.
- AutoTune – a similar product to Melodyne
