= WavePad Audio Editor =

Audio editing software

- Developer: NCH Software
- Initial release: 2004
- Stable release: 19.28 / 11 May 2024; 20 months ago
- Written in: C++
- Operating system: Windows, macOS, Android, iOS
- Available in: English, German, French, Italian, Spanish, Japanese, Chinese, Korean, Swedish, Dutch, Portuguese, Russian
- License: Proprietary Software
- Website: www.nch.com.au/wavepad/index.html

WavePad Audio Editor Software is a multi-platform, digital audio editor and recorder. It supports VST and integrates a stock audio library.

== Features ==
The primary functions and tools of WavePad are:

- Sound editing functions: cut, copy, paste, delete, insert, silence, auto-trim and more
- Audio effects: amplify, normalize, equalize, envelope, reverb, echo, reverse and many more with VST plugin compatibility
- Batch processing allows users to apply effects and/or convert thousands of files as a single function
- Scrub, search, and bookmark audio to find, recall and assemble segments of audio files
- Spectral analysis (FFT), speech synthesis (text-to-speech), and voice changer
- Audio restoration tools including noise reduction and click pop removal
- Supports sample rates from 6 to 96 kHz, stereo or mono, 8, 16, 24 or 32 bits
- Remove vocals from music tracks
- Create ready to use ringtones for mobile phones

== Controversy ==
Previously, WavePad and other NCH products came bundled with optional browser plugins like the Ask and Chrome toolbars, which sparked complaints from users and triggered malware warnings from antivirus software companies like Norton and McAfee. NCH has since unbundled all toolbars in all program versions released after July 2015.

== See also ==
- Comparison of digital audio editors
- Audacity (audio editor)
