= BIAS Peak =

Digital audio editor

Peak
- Developer: BIAS
- Final release: Peak Studio 7.0.3 / 24 October 2011
- Operating system: Mac OS X
- Type: Digital audio editor
- Website: www.bias-inc.com (inactive)

Peak is a digital audio editing application for the Macintosh, used primarily for stereo/mono recording, sample editing, loop creation, and CD mastering. It is commonly used by amateur and professional audio and video editors, mastering engineers, musicians, sound designers, artists, educators, and hobbyists.

It was published by the now defunct company BIAS Inc. in several editions, with varying levels of features.

Peak differs from Digital audio workstation-type audio editing applications in that most of its editing is done directly at the file level, without having to first create a project and import the audio to be edited into it.

Peak can be assigned to many DAW-type applications as a supplemental external sample editor. When used in this capacity, it is similar to having Peak's editing capabilities available as a plug-in within the other application.

BIAS Inc. ceased all business operations as of June, 2012.

== Reviews ==
- BIAS Peak Pro 6 XT review Sound on Sound magazine (January 2009)
- BIAS Peak v5 review Sound on Sound magazine (July 2006)
- BIAS Peak v4 review Sound on Sound magazine (May 2004)
- BIAS Peak v3.1 review Sound on Sound magazine (January 2003)
- BIAS Peak v2.02 review Sound on Sound magazine (June 1999)
- BIAS Peak v1.6 review Sound on Sound magazine (October 1997)
- BIAS Peak v1.0 review Sound on Sound magazine (September 1996]

== See also ==
- Adobe Audition
- DSP-Quattro
- Sound Studio
- WaveLab
