= N-Track Studio =

Digital audio workstation

n-Track Studio
- Developer: n-Track Software
- Release: June 28, 1995; 31 years ago
- Stable release: v10.2.2 / July 11, 2025; 15 months ago
- Operating system: Microsoft Windows, OS X, Linux, macOS, iOS and Android
- Available in: English, Italian, French, Spanish, German, Portuguese, Chinese, Japanese, Indonesian
- Type: Host/Digital audio workstation
- Licence: Proprietary
- Website: ntrack.com

n-Track Studio is a digital audio workstation (DAW) developed by n-Track Software. It supports multitrack audio, MIDI, and step-sequencer recording across Windows, macOS, Linux, iOS, and Android. Features include audio editing, mixing, mastering, an extensive suite of effects and sounds, as well as AI stem separation, custom sampler, 3rd party plug-in support, and integration with the Songtree collaborative platform.

== History ==
In 1995, the first version of n-Track Studio (1.0) was released. It was originally a dialog box with 4 volume sliders for each of the 4 supported tracks. At the time when version 1.0 was released, multitrack recording was still largely done on tape decks or in music studios so n-Track attracted many users to the simplicity and power of the small app.

Major n-Track Studio versions include 10.0 (2023), 9.0 (2018), and 8.0 (2016).

== See also ==
- Digital audio workstation
- Comparison of digital audio editors
