= MusE =

Free software MIDI/Audio sequencer

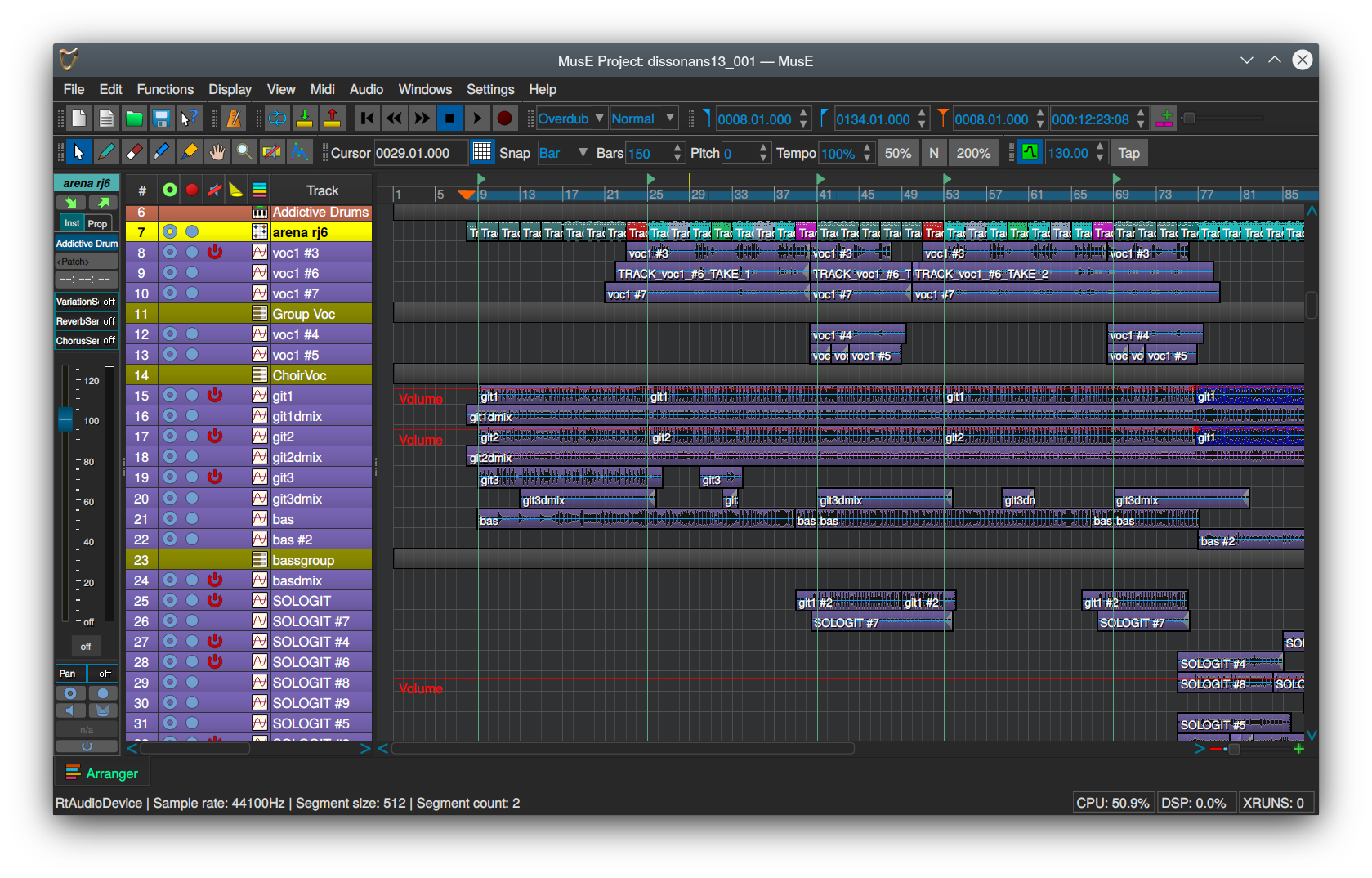
- Screenshot of MusE 4.0
- Original author: Werner Schweer
- Developer: MusE development team
- Initial release: 13 January 2000; 26 years ago
- Stable release: 4.2.1 / 24 September 2023; 2 years ago
- Written in: C++, Qt
- Operating system: Linux
- Type: Digital audio workstation
- License: GPL-2.0-or-later
- Website: muse-sequencer.github.io
- Repository: github.com/muse-sequencer/muse

MusE is computer software, a sequencer for Musical Instrument Digital Interface (MIDI) and audio, with recording and editing abilities. It was originally written by Werner Schweer and now is developed by the MusE development team. It is free software released under GPL-2.0-or-later.

MusE aims to be a complete multitrack virtual studio for Linux. As of 2020, it has no support under other platforms as it relies on Linux-only technologies, such as Advanced Linux Sound Architecture (ALSA). It also supports the Linux Audio Session Handler (LASH).

For version 0.7, the music notation feature was removed from MusE; this code later became the cross-platform notation app MuseScore Studio. A scoring feature returned to MusE in version 2.0.

From version 2.2 MusE supports the LV2 audio plugin format and the formerly supported Linux Audio Developer's Simple Plugin API (LADSPA), Disposable Soft Synth Interface (DSSI), and Virtual Studio Technology (VST).

From version 4.0 a redesigned user interface has been added.
