= Qtractor =

Digital audio workstation application for Linux

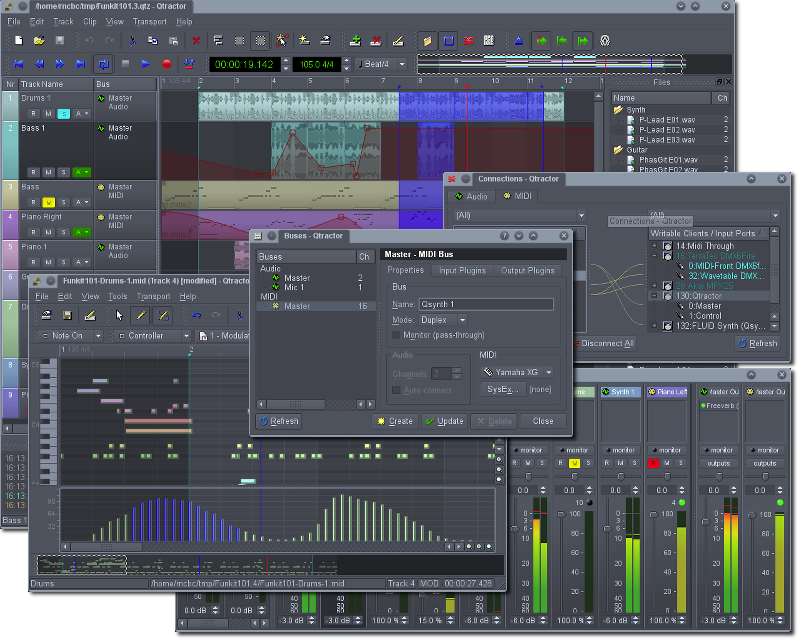
- Qtractor
- Developer: Rui Nuno Capela
- Stable release: 1.6.0 / 1 May 2026; 11 days ago
- Written in: C++ (Qt)
- Operating system: Linux
- Available in: English, French, Portuguese, Spanish, Italian, German, Czech, Russian, Japanese
- Type: Digital audio workstation
- License: GPL-2.0-or-later
- Website: qtractor.org
- Repository: github.com/rncbc/qtractor

Qtractor is a hard disk recorder and digital audio workstation application for Linux. Qtractor is written in C++ and is based on the Qt framework. Its author is Rui Nuno Capela, who is also responsible for the Qjackctl, Qsynth and Qsampler line of Linux audio software. Qtractor's intention was to provide digital audio workstation software simple enough for the average home user, and yet powerful enough for the professional user.

Released under the terms of the GNU General Public License, Qtractor is a free and open-source software application.

== Overview ==
Qtractor is a non-destructive digital audio and MIDI multi-track composition sequencer and arranger software application. It does not affect, alter or modify the audio and/or MIDI files that are displayed as Clip Objects. Exceptions are files resulting from capture and recording operations or from explicit changes made through specialized Clip editing (e.g., MIDI Editor).

Qtractor was simply the hobby project of one developer. Development was started in April 2005, initially as a Qt3 application. It was updated to use Qt4 in October 2006, then Qt5 in 2015. Since September 2020, it targets Qt6.

Qtractor is natively hardwired and exclusive to the JACK Audio Connection Kit infrastructure, and the ALSA sequencer for MIDI. It is a Linux-only application.

== Features ==
- Supports all sample rates, only restricted by hardware.
- Supports multiple audio file formats, both compressed and uncompressed, including older formats such as 8SVX and .iff.
- Clip editing and automatic or manual time stretching abilities.
- Supports most major audio and MIDI file formats and most Linux plugin technologies.
- Clips may be easily edited by dragging the left or right edges for cropping, or even for timeshifting, by using the shift key modifier.
- Qtractor may be used in an audio mastering environment. Its integration with JACK makes it possible to use mastering tools such as JAMin to process the audio data.
- Qtractor has both an audio and MIDI metronome with user selectable audio samples.
- Easily move and copy plugins (with params) among tracks.
- Keyboard commands (hotkeys) are entirely customizable.
- Audition audio files within the Files dialog.
- Built-in Qjackctl Connections dialog.
- Supports LADSPA, DSSI (this includes DSSI-VST wrapper), native Linux VST (version 2 and 3), CLAP and LV2 plugins.

== Compatibility ==
Qtractor relies on plugins to enable many features from audio effects processing to dynamic control. Qtractor supports the LADSPA plugin architecture, as well as DSSI, native Linux VST (versions 2 and 3), CLAP and LV2. Support for Steinberg's VST plugin standard with Wine is available using the DSSI-VST wrapper. Qtractor stores these connections, and re-establishes them when a project is reloaded.

== See also ==
- Ardour (audio processor)
- List of free audio software
- List of Linux audio software
- List of music software
