= MCI (recording studio gear) =

American audio equipment manufacturer

Music Center Incorporated
- Trade name: Music Center Incorporated
- Type: Private
- Industry: Professional audio
- Founded: 1955; 71 years ago in Fort Lauderdale, Florida, United States
- Founder: Grover 'Jeep' Harned
- Defunct: 1982
- Fate: Acquired by Sony
- Successor: Sony
- Headquarters: Fort Lauderdale, Florida, United States
- Area served: Worldwide
- Products: Mult-track Recorders; Audio consoles
- Revenue: US$20 Million (1979) (1979)

Music Center Incorporated (MCI) is the former name of a United States manufacturer of professional audio equipment that operated from 1955 until 1982 when it was acquired by the Sony Corporation. The company is credited with a number of world firsts: commercialising the 24-track multi-track recorder, the tape Auto Locator and in-line mixing console.

== History ==
During the late 1950s Grover 'Jeep' Harned, the founder of MCI, owned and operated a small record and stereo servicing outlet in Ft. Lauderdale, Florida. He also designed and built custom audio equipment such as mixing consoles, audio preamplifiers and general record electronics at the request of customers like Mack Emerman, the owner of the nearby Criteria Recording Studios.

Harned's growing list of record industry contacts led in time to regular referrals, and then to long term service contracts. In addition he installed commercial sound systems for the Parker Playhouse, Pirate's Worlds and Fort Lauderdale International Airport amongst others. Consequently, in 1965 Harned established the company Music Center Incorporated. Many years later Harned recounted the change in direction during an interview

"I got into the tape recorder business in an interesting way. I had built a console for Sidney (Sy) Nathan, owner of King Records in Cincinnati. Sid, Mack Emmerman, and Bob Richardson had a bunch of Ampex 350 tape recorders with transports that still ran well, but electronics that were on the verge of quitting completely. So in 1968 Sid, Bob and Mack got together and hired me to design and build some new "solid state" electronics for the old transports. My electronics proved to be quieter, had lower distortion, and they didn't have the 'Bias Rocks' common to so many earlier designs.

I filled this order for 100 units and I thought that would be the end of it, but when the word got around the industry that there was this guy in Florida building these 'solid state' electronics, a lot more people became interested in them"

In 1968 Tom Hidley, then manager of TTG Recording Studios in Hollywood, asked Harned to supply a 24-track recorder. Hidley had recently modified an Ampex 300 tape machine to accommodate 2-inch open reel magnetic tape and required multitrack audio. Harned delivered a custom built 24-track machine — a modified Ampex 300 — which was commissioned later that year. This unit became the prototype for a new MCI product line, the JH-5 tape recorder. The "JH" designation is attributed to Jeeps first wife: Joyce Harned. Mrs. Harned ran the office bookkeeping and files assigning her own numbering system.

=== Technical innovation ===
In the late 1960s MCI established a network of dealerships across the United States to sell and service a line of preamps, recording electronics and tape recorders. Studio Supply, one of these dealerships was operated by audio engineer Dave Harrison. He asked Harned if he could design a device to enable an audio engineer to switch quickly and easily between monitoring audio input and track mixdown modes. In 1972 MCI introduced the MCI JH-400 series console, the world's first commercial in-line mixing console. Unlike split mixing console models, the in-line JH-400 series consoles offered the user a choice of options and incorporated Harris 911 IC op-amps, at a lower cost than its competitors.

With the release in 1975 of its JH-500 series mixing consoles, MCI became the first manufacturer to design a sound mixer containing voltage controlled amplifiers (VCA) to aid in mixing multiple channels. Console automation became a necessity at a time when the number of mixing channels grew and there were more faders than a single operator could manage. With VCAs, the engineer could adjust multiple selected channels simultaneously with one fader, without changing the relative levels of the selected channels. VCA technology cost a fraction of the price of motorized moving fader automation (Flying Faders), the competing standard of the time.

The MCI tape AutoLocator, another innovation, was similar in design to a remote control though it had advanced functions such as storing a number of presets to recall a particular position of a given recording track. This proved to be a great time saver during the overdubbing process. The MCI JH-45 Autolock enabled a person with average technical experience to quickly configure two JH-24 multi-track recorders for synchronized recording. Other companies incorporated these features into their products but in many cases, MCI innovated first.

MCI's success could also be attributable to its aggressive pricing strategy as MCI's marketing Vice President Lutz Meyer later attested.

"Our competitors literally took apart our AutoLocator product but couldn't see how we could possibly price it. It had 50 Integrated Circuit chips, it was like a small computer. They couldn't make the same equipment without selling it for twice our price.

"It took Ampex and 3M years to realise it was our loss-leader. Every time we shipped an AutoLocator out, $700 or $800 was going out the door but recording engineers wanted it. And it worked, they are ordering other MCI products".

=== Commercial success ===
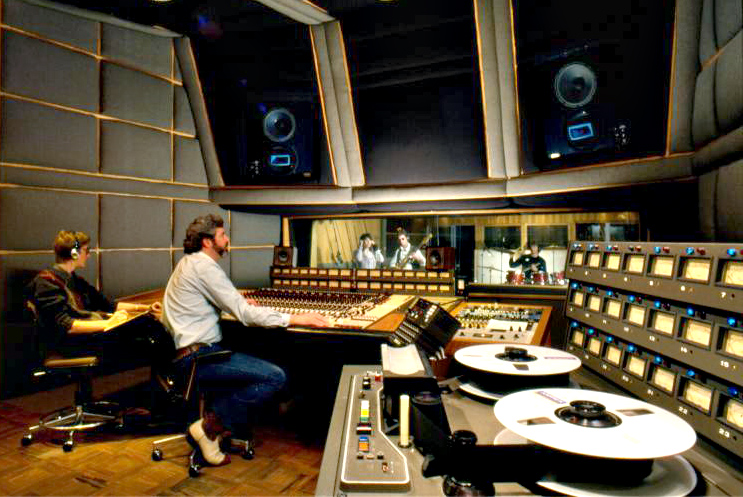
MCI equipped studio. Image courtesy of Fred Lyon

MCI's reputation was built on technical innovation and its budget priced systems that were popular with independent music studios. During the 1970s the MCI brand was tied to the fortunes of the Criteria Studios. Rock musician Eric Clapton recorded his 1974 album 461 Ocean Boulevard at Criteria, which had served as the testbed for MCI's new products since the early 1960s. The Eagles recorded their best selling singles at Criteria, and likewise the Bee Gees chose Criteria to record Saturday Night Fever, the biggest-selling album of the 1970s.

MCI branded equipment was renowned for its high build quality and features that generally gave it a competitive edge over more expensive brands such as 3M, Neve and Studer. These features included the Autolocator, constant tension reel servos, wrap and azimuth adjustable heads, long wearing ceramic capstans and one button punch-in and punch-out. MCI marketing appeal coincided with the emergence in the mid 1970s of independent music studio operators. Aspiring studio operators fell into either of two categories: those with deep pockets that could afford $45,000 or more for high-end 3M, Neve or Studer gear, and the remainder who could not. MCI placed half-page press adverts in industry magazines (such as Record Engineer/Producer (RE/P)) promoting comparable MCI equipment sets for as a little as $25,000-30,000.

MCI continued to grow as Harned confirmed:

"Today, we build our own motors, make our own faders, printed circuit boards, have our own paint shop, do our own silk screening. . . in short we have almost completely integrated manufacturing capacity for professional audio equipment".

By the late 1970s, MCI's annual revenue stood at an estimated $20m and its products had a 36% market-share in the US domestic market and 45% internationally. The company had a workforce of 250 staff and dealerships in more than 30 countries. Later still AC/DC's Back in Black, For Those About To Rock and many Queen, Led Zeppelin, and other rock albums were recorded on the Harrison-designed MCI consoles. Other famous artists that used MCI branded equipment included Roy Orbison, Tangerine Dream and Kraftwerk.

=== Digital revolution ===
In 1977, the 2-inch analog multitrack format was well-entrenched in high-end studios, with a wide selection of competing product offerings from companies like Ampex, and MCI amongst others. That year saw the introduction of the world's first commercial quality 32-track digital recorder by 3M. MCI unveiled a prototype 3-inch, 32-track analog deck in 1978, which showed Harned's willingness to try new ideas, though it never went into production. Later that year American artist Ry Cooder released Bop 'Till You Drop, the world's first digitally recorded, mixed and mastered pop album, using 3M's digital recorder.

In 1980, the Sony Corporation and Philips Consumer Electronics (Philips) published the Red Book for the Compact Disc, an industry standard of consumer grade digital media. Many recording studios retooled to support end to end digital production. MCI was one of several major equipment manufacturers that backed Sony's new Digital Audio Stationary Head digital recording standard. In the early 1980s Sony wanted to extend its business operations into the US manufacturing sector and approached Harned with a buyout offer. The Sony Professional Products Division was established in Fort Lauderdale specifically to accommodate this acquisition.

== Notable products ==
=== JH-5 Tape Recorder Electronics ===
A single channel solid state electronics unit for professional tape recorders

=== JH-8 Tape Recorder Electronics ===
An 8 channel solid state electronics unit for professional tape recorders utilizing the same circuitry as the JH-5

=== JH-10 Multitrack Tape Recorder ===
MCI's first 2-inch open-reel tape recorder. Utilizing MCI's newly designed JH-10 transport with 2 JH-8 units for 16 track or 3 JH-8 units for 24 track.

=== JH-16 Multitrack Tape Recorder ===
The JH-16 Series of Multitrack Tape Recorders was MCI's first mass-produced series of tape recorders and was produced from 1971 to 1979. The JH-16 designation encompassed three models of tape recorders from MCI with three different transport series, all known as JH-16 series tape recorders: JH-10 (1971-1973), JH-100 (1973-1975), and JH-114 (1975-1979). The JH-16 came in three configurations: 1-inch, 8-track; 2-inch, 16- track; and 2-inch, 24-track. All three transport series operate in 15 ips or 30 ips, with the JH-100 and JH-114 transport series offering Vari-speed capability.

=== JH-24 Multitrack Tape Recorder ===
The JH-24 Series of Multitrack Tape Recorders was produced from 1980 to 1988 and was the successor to MCI's JH-16 Series. With the JH-24, MCI kept the JH-114 series transport and completely redesigned the audio electronics by implementing a transformless design utilizing differential amplification for the line inputs, line outputs, and head coupling to improve the machine's technical specifications. Additionally, MCI implemented switches on each channel's Record/Cue card allowing the operator to switch equalization networks to align the machine to either NAB or IEC standards. As with the JH-16, the JH-24 came in three configurations: 1-inch, 8-track; 2-inch, 16- track; and 2-inch, 24-track.

=== JH-400 Series Console ===
The JH-416 introduced the "In Line Monitoring" configuration that became the standard for many future console designs from both MCI and other manufacturers. In 1974, the product was redesigned as the JH-428, a 24-track recording console.

=== JH-500 Series Console ===
This model was first produced in 1975 and became the preferred recording console for Atlantic Records in New York and Criteria Studio in Miami. In time the model range included A, B, C, & D versions offering 28, 32, 36, 38, 42, & 56 channel mainframe configurations. Metering was available as either VU or Light Meters. The 500 Series was highly configurable and was available with a wide array of customization options. The JH-556 was the first recording console designed specifically to cater for dual 24 track recording.

=== JH-600 Series Console ===
The JH-600 series included many of the JH-500 features in a more compact frame with automation. A totally new transformerless design, many engineers believed the JH-600 to be the cleanest sounding MCI console yet. And the console was relatively low-priced, making it possible for many studios in the 1980s to buy a JH-600 in combination with a JH-24 tape recorder and JH-110B 2-track tape recorder, making for an "All MCI" studio.
