= RiffWorks =

Music recording and editing software

RiffWorks Screenshot

RiffWorks is a guitar recording and online song collaboration program for Mac OS and Windows. RiffWorks is designed and developed by Sonoma Wire Works. The program includes guitar effects, drum tracks, an online music collaboration system, and the ability to post songs to its online community, RiffWorld.com.

== History ==
In 2004, RiffWorks was released to be compatible with Line 6 GuitarPort, PODxt and TonePort ASIO devices. In 2006, RiffWorks was updated to work with all ASIO and CoreAudio devices. In 2008, RiffWorks T4, a free edition, was released as a download from Sonomawireworks.com and is bundled in several Line 6 and IK Multimedia products.

This product was discontinued by Sonomawireworks in 2022, with support dropped on October 31 that year.

== Features ==
RiffWorks recording software includes loop recording, automatic track creation (24 tracks), seven guitar-oriented effects and support for amp modeling software.

RiffWorks Standard includes four drum options, InstantDrummer, created from studio drum kit recordings (with more content available from Sonoma Wire Work's website.) RiffWork's Metronome, a user-adjustable metronome. RiffWorks' REX Player, an audio loop player (which is not available in the free version.) RiffWorks also supports ReWire.
