= Mixcraft =

Digital audio recording studio

- Developers: Acoustica, Inc. (Yosemite Valley, CA)
- Release: April 16, 2004; 22 years ago
- Stable release: 10.6 build 636 / October 1, 2025; 12 months ago
- Operating system: Microsoft Windows
- Type: Digital audio workstation
- License: Proprietary
- Website: www.acoustica.com/mixcraft

Mixcraft is a digital audio workstation for Windows, developed by Acoustica since its first release in April 2004. It is a digital audio workstation, MIDI sequencer, virtual instrument host, non-linear video arranger, and music loop recording program.

== Editions ==
Acoustica has developed three editions of Mixcraft:

- Mixcraft Home Studio: The lite edition of the music software and currently download-only. The included features are up to 16 audio or virtual instrument tracks. The recording studio has a loop library of 7,500 loops, samples, and sound effects.
- Mixcraft Recording Studio: The default version of the music software and currently download-only. The included features are unlimited audio, MIDI, video, and virtual instrument tracks. The recording studio has a loop library of 7,500 loops, samples, and sound effects.
- Mixcraft Pro Studio: The professional version that offers more variety in virtual instruments and audio effects. Additional features include AI stem separation and Audio to MIDI conversion. Additional plugins include Acoustica Pianissimo Virtual Grand Piano, Cherry Audio DCO-106, and Celemony Melodyne Essential (with ARA support). The product has been promoted for the use of professional musicians, producers, and engineers.

== Features ==
- MIDI: Support for MIDI data played on one or more MIDI controller keyboards.
- VSTi Support: Allows virtual instruments to be played, sequenced, and recorded via MIDI data. (Includes VST 3).
- Multitrack Recording: Allows for recordings to be created simultaneously from multiple sound card or audio interface inputs simultaneously.
- Performance Clip Sequencing: Similar to Ableton and Bitwig, it supports pattern clip–based arrangement.
- Tempo Matching: This feature attempts to detect the tempo and key of a pre-recorded audio file, and changes the tempo to match the project tempo.
- Audio Time Stretching & Pitch Shifting: Mixcraft claims to use an advanced algorithm to provide high quality time stretching and pitch shifting while minimizing CPU usage.
- Multiple Import/Export Formats: Supporting MP3, WAV, WMA, OGG, FLAC, and AIFF file formats.
- Video Sequencing: Editing, Image Additions, Font Additions, Automation, and Effects (Supports MP4, AVI, and WMV etc files.).
