= SpectraLayers =

Digital audio editing software suite

- Original author: Divide Frame
- Developer: Steinberg Media Technologies GmbH
- Stable release: 12 / July 2, 2025; 4 months ago
- Operating system: macOS; Microsoft Windows
- Type: Digital audio editor
- License: Proprietary
- Website: https://www.steinberg.net/spectralayers/

SpectraLayers is a digital audio editing software suite published by Steinberg Media Technologies GmbH and created by Robin Lobel. It is designed for audio spectrum editing, catering to professional and semi-professional users. It was originally published by Sony Creative Software under the name Sony SpectraLayers, until most of their products were acquired by MAGIX on 24 May 2016. Then in 2019, the software was acquired by Steinberg.

== Overview ==
SpectraLayers is an advanced audio spectrum editor which allows extraction of sounds, audio restoration and creative sound design through the use of a spectral view. Its interface is similar to an image editor.

== History ==
SpectraLayers was developed by Divide Frame and published by Sony as SpectraLayers Pro in July 2012.

SpectraLayers Pro 2, released in July 2013, improved speed and added features like Spectral Casting/Molding, markers and metadata support, and non-linear scales.

SpectraLayers Pro 3, released in January 2015 further improved performance, also adding 24-bit/192kHz audio support, and redesigning many UI components.

SpectraLayers Pro 4, released in December 2016 is the first update released by Magix Software GmbH after its acquisition of SpectraLayers, and introduced support for Pro Tools and multiple project tabs.

SpectraLayers Pro 5 was released in May 2018. The new features include a reworked GUI, HD spectrogram, Heal Action and Frequency Repair tool. Dr. Bill Evans made additional contributions to the features design and user interface of this release.

SpectraLayers Pro 6 was released by Steinberg in July 2019 and introduced ARA support.

SpectraLayers Pro 7 was released in August 2020 and introduced processes based on artificial intelligence algorithms.

SpectraLayers Pro 8 was released in June 2021. The new key features were Smarter AI, De-Bleed process, AI Reverb Reduction, EQ Matching and Ambience Matching.

SpectraLayers Pro 9 was released in June 2022, bringing workflow improvements.

SpectraLayers Pro 10 was released in June 2023, with new unmixing functionality and improved speech recognition.

SpectraLayers Pro 11 was released in June 2024, improving and adding new AI modules for unmixing and restoration, modules chaining, batch processing, new selection and editing tools and volume envelopes.

SpectraLayers Pro 12 was released in July 2025, including two new unmixing modules, with other improvements to unmixing, voice processing, multi-layer editing, selection tools, general operation and the user interface.

== See also ==
- Comparison of digital audio editors
