= Open Media Framework Interchange =

Open Media Format (OMF), Open Media Framework, or Open Media Framework Interchange (OMFI), is a platform-independent file format intended for transfer of digital media between different software applications.

OMFI is a file format that aids in exchange of digital media across applications and platforms. This framework enables users to import media elements and to edit information and effects summaries. Sequential media representation is the primary concern that is addressed by this format.

The primary objective of OMFI is video production. However, there are a number of additional features which can be listed as follows:

- The origin of the data can be easily backtracked or identified since the import material is in the form of a videotape or film.
- There are predefined effects and transitions, which paves the way for easy and quick overlapping and sequencing of various track.
- The format supports motion control. (i.e. enabling a particular segment to play at a ratio of the speed of another segment)

Some of the key benefits of OMFI are:

- It saves time by getting rid of tape-based file transfers.
- It brings in flexibility owing to its ability to use a number of applications on multiple workstations.
- The format preserves the best sound and picture quality during all imports.
- It eliminates the risk of file formatting and incompatibilities, which in turn allows users to spend their productive time on the creative aspects of their work.
- It preserves the formatting information during file transfers between applications or workstations. Hence, the need for rebuilding the effects and sequences is eliminated.

The OMFI format consists of four primary sections namely Header, Object data, Object dictionary and Track data. The header contains an index of all the segments that constitute the file.

== See also ==
- Advanced Authoring Format
