= Record (software) =

Music software program

- Record running on Mac OS X Leopard
- Developer(s): Propellerhead Software
- Stable release: 1.5.1 / 19 November 2010; 14 years ago
- Operating system: Mac OS X, Windows
- Type: Digital audio workstation
- License: Proprietary
- Website: propellerheads.se/record/

Record is a music software program developed by Swedish software developers Propellerhead Software. Designed for recording, arrangement and mixing, it emulates a recording studio, with a mixing desk, a rack of virtual instruments and effects and an audio and MIDI sequencer. Record can be used either as a complete virtual recording studio in itself, or together with Propellerhead Software's Reason.

== General ==
Record was released on September 9, 2009, after a two-month trial period, open to users who signed up at www.recordyou.com.

The program's design mimics an SSL 9000k mixing desk and a rack into which users can insert virtual devices such as instruments and effects processors. These modules can be controlled from Record's built-in MIDI and audio sequencer or from other sequencing applications via Propellerhead's ReWire protocol. Hotkeys are used for switching between these three main areas.

Recording of external audio sources is handled in Record's built-in sequencer, which includes tools for comping together multiple takes into a single recording, and automatic timestretch when the tempo is changed.

Like Propellerhead's Reason, Record's interface includes a Toggle Rack command, which flips the rack around to display the devices from the rear. Here the user can route virtual audio and CV cables from one piece of equipment to another. This cable layout enables the creation of complex effects chains and allows devices to modulate one another.

In reviews, Record has been praised for its stability, the quality of the time stretch algorithm and built-in mixer, as well as the seamless integration with Reason, while it has been criticized for its lack of support for third party plug-ins.

In 2011, Record was merged into Reason 6, and the standalone version was discontinued.

== Instruments and effects ==
Record contains a limited set of instruments and effects that can be expanded with Propellerhead's Reason. Included with Record are:

- Combinator: combines multiple modules into on, to create new instruments and effect chains
- ID-8: a sample playback device featuring drums, pianos, bass, strings, etc.
- MClass Equalizer: a four-band EQ
- MClass Stereo Imager: a two band stereo imaging processor
- MClass Compressor: single band compressor
- MClass Maximizer: limiter device
- Line 6 Guitar Amp: a virtual version of Line 6's guitar POD, emulating three guitar amplifiers and speaker cabinets
- Line 6 Bass Amp: a virtual version of Line 6's bass POD, emulating two bass amplifiers and speaker cabinets
- Neptune Pitch Correction & Voice Synth: a hybrid effect and instrument device for correcting pitch and adding synthesized harmonies
- RV7000 Advanced Reverb: a reverb with nine reverb algorithms, including Small Space, Room, Hall, Arena, Plate, Spring, Echo, Multitap and Reverse
- Scream 4 Distortion: a distortion module with ten different distortion models: Overdrive, Distortion, Fuzz, Tube, Tape, Feedback, Modulate, Warp, Digital and Scream
- DDL-1 Digital Delay Line: a simple delay effect
- CF-101 Chorus/Flanger: a chorus and flanger effect

== Additional Interface ==
Pressing the tab key on the computer keyboard reveals the Record racks back side, where you can access additional parameters for the rackmounted devices, including signal cables for audio and CV. This allows users to virtually route cables connecting the devices in the rack like in a traditional hardware based studio. For example, a device's output can be split into two signal chains for different processing, and the connected to different mixer channels. Users can choose where to draw the line between simplicity and precision, allowing Record to remain useful at various levels of knowledge and ambition on the user's part.

== Record 1.5 ==
A new version was released on 25 August 2010. New features include Blocks, a non-linear sequencer mode for arranging and writing music, and the Neptune device, a pitch-editing tool and voice synth designed for vocals. Other features include: use of multiple USB keyboards, tap-tempo, and reverse audio, as well as integration with Reason 5.

== See also ==
- Reason
- Ableton Live
- Cubase
- FL Studio
- Logic Pro
- Pro Tools
- REAPER
- Mixcraft
- List of music software
