= Acoustica (software) =

Digital audio editor

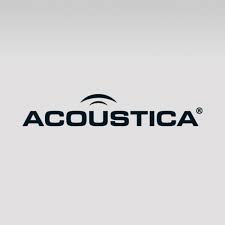
- Developer(s): Acon Digital
- Stable release: 7.4.0 / May 19, 2022
- Operating system: Microsoft Windows or MacOS
- Type: Digital audio editor
- License: Proprietary
- Website: Acon Digital Acoustica: Product page

Acoustica is a digital audio editor from Acon Digital. Acoustica is available in two editions:

- Acoustica Standard Edition with a set of processing tools for mastering, audio restoration and sound design
- Acoustica Premium Edition, which adds spectral editing and support for multi-channel audio up to 7.1.2 channels, as well as additional processing tools and a large collection of plug-ins for use in host applications with support for Virtual Studio Technology, Virtual Studio Technology, Audio Units or AAX plug-ins. Version 7.4 also includes an Audio Random Access plug-in with the complete functionality of the clip editor in Acoustica.

Both editions share the same basic editing features, including single track clip editing and multitrack sessions as well as batch processing and audio CD projects. The audio output can be analyzed using real-time analysis tools such as level metering (RMS, peak and peak hold), loudness metering (EBU R-128), spectrum analysis and phase correlation metering. Audio can be recorded with resolutions up to 32 bit and 192 kHz sampling rate.

== Reviews ==
- Review of Acoustica 7 by Bedroom Producers Blog
- Review of Acoustica 7.2 by MusicTech
- Review of Acoustica 7.2 by TapeOp Magazine
- Review of Acoustica 7.2 by ProducerSphere

== See also ==
- Audacity - Open Source alternative audio editor
- Steinberg Wavelab
- Sony Sound Forge
- List of music software
