= Total Recorder =

Digital audio editing software

- Developers: High Criteria, Inc.
- Website: http://www.totalrecorder.com

Total Recorder is a digital audio editor software from High Criteria, Inc. which is able to record digital sound either directly through the computer's soundcard, or virtually through its software driver.

The virtual driver provides the advantage of recording audio reproduced by an external program (including Internet broadcasts) directly in digital format, i.e. without digital-analog-digital conversions leading to loss of quality, and even in those cases when a computer soundcard has no loop-back line (e.g. Stereo Mix, "What you hear"). Total Recorder is a shareware program. The evaluation version of Total Recorder is a fully functional version of the program, with the exception that an audible noise will be inserted about every 60 seconds.

== Editions ==
Total Recorder is offered in four editions: Standard, Professional, Developer, and VideoPro (beginning with version 8.0 of Total Recorder). Different functionalities are available in different editions.

== Supported formats ==
=== Video ===
- AVI
- WMV (Windows Media Video)
- FLV (Flash Video)
- MOV (for playback only)
- MPEG-4
- 3GP

=== Audio ===
- PCM (uncompressed)
- RIFF-WAV (Compressed and uncompressed)
- MP3
- WMA
- Ogg Vorbis
- FLAC (Monkey's Audio)
- APE
- AAC audio within MPEG-4
- 3GP

== Features ==
Recording of audio and video from different sources, sound format conversion, sound editing, sound processing, background recording (ripping), timeshifting, cue-sheet file supporting, splitting, tagging, file name generation, etc.

== Add-ons ==
The following free and trial add-ons are available: Audio Restoration Add-On, Automatic Gain Control and Speech Enhancement Add-On, Spectrum Analyzer and Graphic Equalizer Add-On, Digital Mixer Add-On, Ogg Vorbis Support Add-On, Send to iTunes/iPod Add-On, Streaming Add-on. They can be used for removing distortions such as clicks, and crackles, providing high-quality restoration of audio recorded from LPs, tapes, and microphones, enhancing the recording and playback of both the music and the spoken word, mixing operations, and performing other sound processing.

== ScrptExec Utility ==
ScrptExec is a free command line utility designed to execute simple scripts. ScrptExec can be useful to simulate user keyboard input in a window (e.g. you can use it to enter a user name and a password on a web page) or automatically reply to a pop-up message (e.g. you can use it to reply to messages such as "Do you want to close all tabs?" or "Are you sure you want to navigate away from this page?" that prevent you from closing the Internet Explorer window), etc.

== Reviews ==
"A cult favorite, Total Recorder impresses not with its interface or list of features but with its precise ability to record and save any sounds coming across your PC.... The only hassle with Total Recorder is that it usually gives files generic names, and it doesn't have a title lookup engine, so you'll need to tag tracks by hand." - Troy Dreier, PC Magazine.

"One major attraction of Total Recorder is its ease of use. This is especially true when undertaking basic recording, playback and editing … One particularly convenient feature is the facility for setting up recording source and parameters to meet specific situations. Any number of different recording sources can be established, including the file format to be used, and can be selected quickly." - Andrew Downie, CLT.

"Whether off the Net, a CD, a microphone or whatever else you might plug into the input of your soundcard, TRPE is designed to record any audio passing through it, including audio from games and anything else you hear in real-time. Plus, there are a host of well thought out and useful features including a meter to monitor the volume of the input source (to eliminate a distorted recording), the ability to append a recording or insert audio into a recording at a particular position, a selection of parameters to customize your recording depending on whether you're recording from the Internet or your soundcard, and an elaborate but easy-to-use screen to schedule recordings. … A nice touch is the option to turn off sounds assigned to system events. This eliminates the possibility of spending 20 minutes recording a stream off the Net only to have those “bings”, “dings” and other annoying Windows sounds showing up in the final mix." - Corey Deitz, About.com Guide to Radio.

"Regardless, there’s a simple $17.95 program called Total Recorder that bypasses all the problems and lets you record audio generated from a website, MP3 program or other source that uses your computer’s internal speakers." - Chad Savage.
