= MuLab (MuTools) =

Digital audio workstation

- Original author: MuTools
- Developer: MuTools
- Initial release: December 2007; 18 years ago
- Stable release: 10.1.23 / 26 November 2025; 32 days ago
- Operating system: OS X, Windows
- Type: Digital audio workstation
- License: Proprietary
- Website: www.mutools.com

MuLab is a digital audio workstation application for macOS (OS X) and Windows platforms.

It is developed and maintained by a small company (MuTools, Belgium) led by Jo Langie, a pioneer in sequencer technology since early Atari microcomputers.

While the main MuLab target is electronic music, it can be also used for other musical genres. It may be also of interest for educational purposes to people learning digital audio processing.

== Features ==
MuLab has most of the features of a standard full DAW: audio/MIDI recording, MIDI sequencing, mixing, automation, control surface interaction, multi-core, stock synths, samplers and effects, multi-projects and templates, etc.

MuLab has an internal architecture built around a modular system (Mux) enabling customized instruments and effects by drawing graphs of modules.

MuLab is also an open environment supporting existing VST plugins.

== See also ==
- Comparison of digital audio editors
- Comparison of MIDI editors and sequencers
- List of music software
- Multitrack recording
- Music sequencer
- Music Workstation
