= Harrison Audio =

American audio equipment manufacturer

- Type: Subsidiary
- Industry: Professional audio
- Founded: 1975; 51 years ago
- Founder: Dave Harrison
- Headquarters: Nashville, Tennessee, U.S.
- Number of employees: 50 (2005)
- Parent: Solid State Logic
- Website: harrisonaudio.com

Harrison Audio is an international company based in Nashville, Tennessee that manufactures high-end mixing consoles, Digital Audio Workstations (DAW), audio plugins, and other audio technologies for the post-production, video production, broadcast, sound reinforcement and music recording industries. The company is renowned as an industry innovator for its "in-line" mixing console design that has subsequently become the standard for nearly every large-format music console. In October 2023, Harrison was acquired by Solid State Logic.

== History ==
=== Background ===
In the early 1970s, Dave Harrison established the Studio Supply Company, a Nashville, Tennessee recording equipment retailer and dealer for Music Center Incorporated (MCI) and their line of recording electronics and multitrack tape recorders. In 1972, he approached MCI's CEO Jeep Harned with a concept for an in-line mixing console that simplified the incorporation of multitrack recorders into a console signal path. MCI leased Harrison's design, introducing the MCI JH-400 series console, the world's first commercially available in-line console.

In late 1973, Harrison, together with Tom Piper, formed Pandora Systems to manufacture audio equipment, including limiters, the Time Line (a digital delay), and the Speed Freak (a device to manipulate the running time of the MCI tape machine). Harrison began development on what would become the 3232 console, intending on licensing the design to MCI again. When MCI chose not to license Harrison's design and instead released the 500 Series, Pandora Systems manufactured Harrison's console design, introducing it in December 1975. In February 1976, Studio Supply Company was sold and Harrison Systems, Inc. was formed.

=== Harrison Systems ===
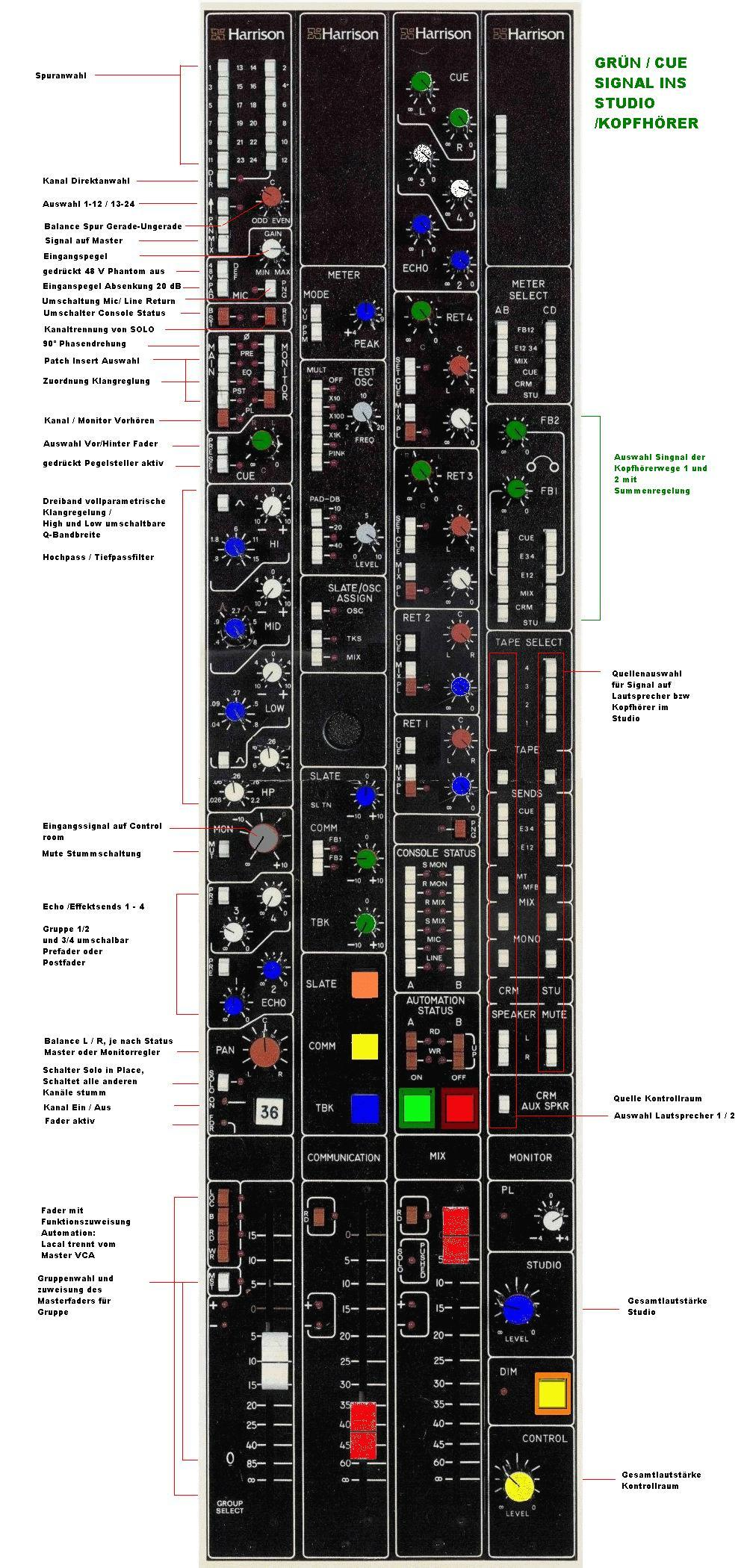
Harrison MR-3 input layout

During the first decade of its existence, Harrison Systems produced a series of popular consoles for the film, music, and broadcast TV markets, beginning in 1975 with its first product, the Harrison 3232, and the first 32 Series product. This was followed by the PP-1 film console, the MR-2, MR-3, and MR-4 music recording consoles, the TV-3, TV-4 broadcast consoles, the HM-5 live console, the Raven music recording console, and the Air-7/Pro-7 broadcast and production consoles. These fully-analog console designs continued into the 1990s, while the digital revolution was taking place. During this period of rapid digital development, Harrison still continued to produce analog consoles (often with some digital elements) such as the AIR 790/PRO 790 broadcast and production consoles, AP-100 on-air production console, the MR-20 music console, the industry workhorse TV-950 and Pro-950 production consoles, and finally the TV5.1 surround-capable broadcast console.

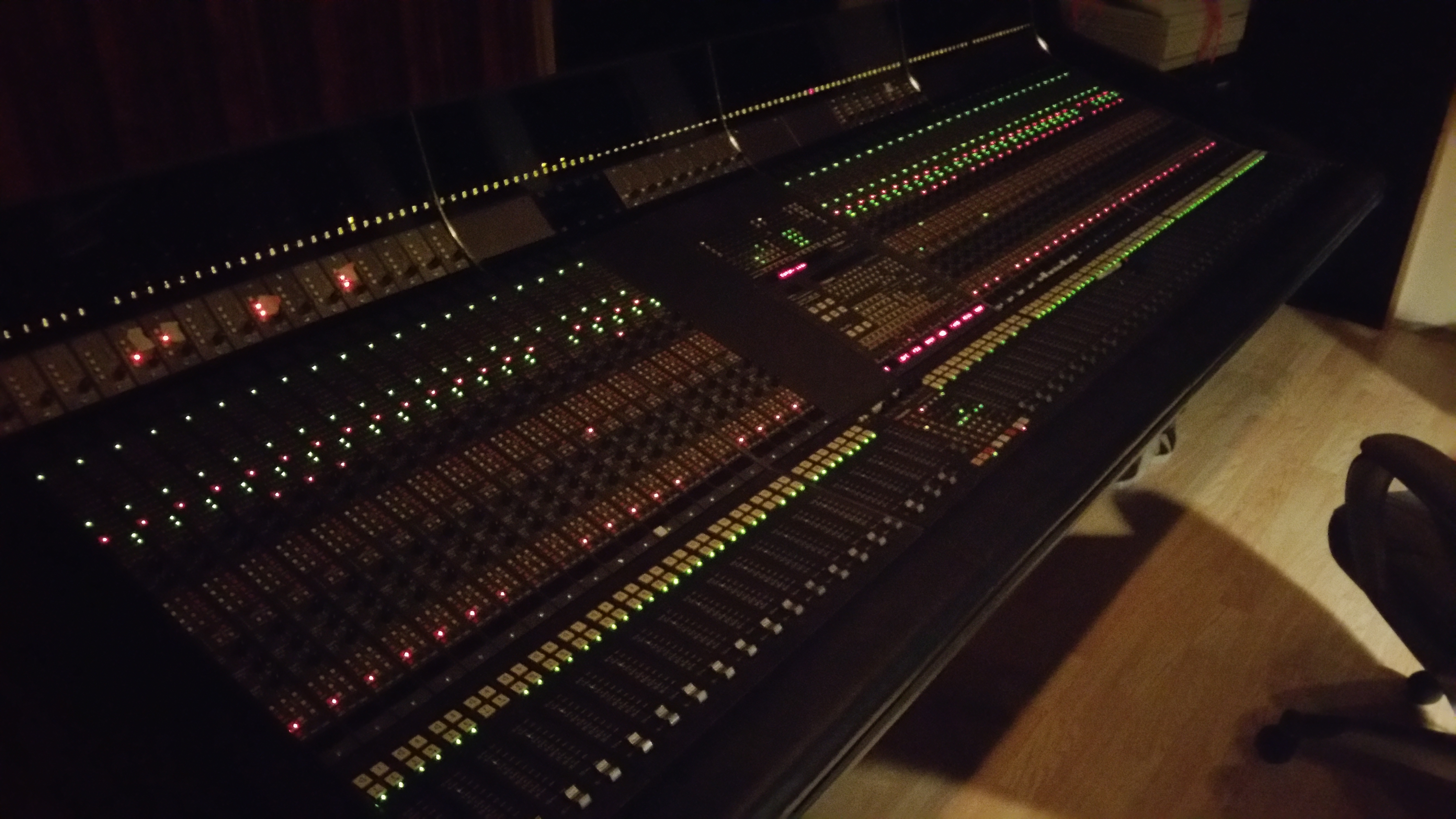
Harrison SeriesTEN – World's first digitally controlled analog console.

In 1985, Harrison introduced its SeriesTen, the world's first digitally controlled analog mixer with console automation. The SeriesTen used only 3 knobs above each channel strip to "page" between various functions of the console. By separating the knob from the actual audio signal, it was possible to instantly save and recall the settings of the console, without mechanically turning the knobs on the surface. At the time this was unheard of, but it has now become a ubiquitous feature of every digital console on the market. Perhaps proving that the SeriesTen was ahead of its time, many SeriesTen consoles were still in use in 2009.

ABBA installed a Harrison console at their Polar Studios where they recorded many of their biggest hits. The a capella introduction to Kansas' Carry On Wayward Son was recorded from Harrison console preamps directly to tape. Throughout the 1980s, seminal music works were mixed on Harrison consoles: Michael Jackson's Thriller and Bad albums were both mixed on a Harrison console by Bruce Swedien. Janet Jackson's Rhythm Nation was mixed on a Harrison SeriesTen, and Sade's album Promise and her prior hit song Smooth Operator were recorded and mixed on a Harrison console.

In 1989, Harrison Systems was acquired by GLW Incorporated. GLW's first product introduction was the release of the SeriesTenB, an updated version of the SeriesTen utilizing a powerful Mac-based automation system coupled with new video interactive graphics for display of console information and the control of console functions through the use of an interactive video screen. The company's technological advances accelerated in the 1990s as additional resources were dedicated to research and development. The first fruits of these efforts was the introduction in 1992 of the fully automated Harrison MPC (Motion Picture Console) followed shortly thereafter by the debut of its sister console, the fully automated Harrison SeriesTwelve.

The Series10 technology was advanced in a follow-up product for film, the MPC. The MPC was a control surface that remotely controlled the audio processing racks. This separation of the control surface from the audio racks allowed the audio processing racks to be placed in the machine rooms, thus allowing for sleeker, cooler, and more acoustic-friendly control surface designs tailored to fit the needs and applications of each individual user. Additional technologies such as automated, motorized joysticks and advanced monitoring features were also incorporated into the MPC.

The Harrison SeriesTenB with its new automation system and interactive video graphics was recipient in 1991 of the coveted Mix Foundation Technical Achievements Award for Console Technology, the TEC Award. Shortly thereafter, the first MPC was installed at Sony Pictures in Hollywood in 1992, the first truly fully automated large format film re-recording console. The MPC was designed in a tight collaboration with Jeff Taylor, chief engineer at Sony Pictures, and many film and post-production mixers. The ongoing relationship between Harrison and Sony Pictures Post Production Facilities in Hollywood has resulted in the purchase of thirteen massive, fully automated MPC consoles by Sony.

During the late 1990s, there was a clear demand for a digital processing engine that could satisfy the need for increased channel counts that were becoming possible with new digital production techniques. Harrison developed the digital. engine, a powerful DSP mixing and routing engine that could provide 768 fully resourced channels and thousands of input and output signals. The digital engine was designed to retrofit existing analog MPC or Series12 consoles with a new digital backend. Many Harrison customer upgraded their existing consoles to the new engine because it was cost-effective and did not incur the "downtime" of replacing an entire console.

Harrison continued its technological advancements and was awarded another TEC Award in 1999, this time for Outstanding Technical Achievement in Sound Reinforcement Console Technology. This award was granted to the Harrison LPC (Live Performance Console). The LPC console was co-developed with touring sound company Showco to create a no-compromise sound reinforcement console. Taking advantage of Harrison's digitally controlled-analog technology, and a newly developed IKIS automation engine, the LPC was designed with motorized potentiometers for every console parameter. Similar to Harrison's motorized joysticks, the motorized potentiometers allowed the user of the console to work in an intuitive way while providing all the benefits of digital surfaces such as instant recall.

In 2000, Harrison was awarded a patent for their use of automated, motorized panning joysticks. This technology has been licensed to other console manufacturers.

During the early 2000s, increasingly complicated audio productions drove the adoption of TFT screens into the meter bridges of digital consoles. Harrison developed Linux-based TFT screens that simultaneously show EQ curves, panning, auxes, metering, bus assignments and dynamics. In addition, a new PreView waveform technology was developed for the screens. This technology allows users to see cues before and after they happen, much like the waveform views on a workstation. This feature was incorporated into the MPC4-D. The MPC4-D has been adopted by premiere film dubbing stages around the world, such as Universal Studios (Hollywood), CinePostproduction (Munich), MosFilm (Moscow), Shree Balaji (Mumbai), and Deluxe (Toronto).

Many international blockbuster films have been mixed on Harrison Consoles: Transformers 1 and 2, Spider-Man 1 through 3, Jurassic Park, Pearl Harbor, Harry Potter, The Passion of the Christ and Amélie are some examples. Television shows The Simpsons, 24, and CSI are mixed on a Harrison console.

In 2004, the Trion, a more cost-effective version of the Series12 multi-purpose console surface was developed. The Trion uses Universal Serial Bus (USB) connectivity and other non-proprietary hardware. The Air24 was also developed using the same technology for on-air radio broadcast. The new smaller surfaces needed a smaller processing engine, so the Xrange native processing system was developed for use in all Harrison products. The Xrange uses Linux and off-the-shelf computers instead of the proprietary systems common to previous-generation consoles. A Harrison console system is made up by the combination of an application-specific console surface (MPC, Trion or Air24), along with a processing engine (Xrange), and an automation computer (IKIS). Each of the three pieces (surface, processing, and automation) are updated regularly by Harrison to accommodate new technologies.

Harrison has adopted Linux as the underlying technology for all of their products. The automation system, console surfaces, DSP processing, and audio routing all incorporate Linux at some level. Harrison has also collaborated with open-source developers on their Xdubber and Harrison Mixbus products which is based on the Ardour open-source workstation.

== Impact and accolades ==
Over 1,500 Harrison consoles have been installed worldwide, presenting a significant percentage of the overall world market share for high-end audio consoles. The company founder, Dave Harrison, was inducted as a Fellow in the Audio Engineering Society for this technical contribution of the recording industry and in particular the first 32-bus "in-line" console.

== Selected users ==
Studio in the Country (Louisiana) – Kansas
Westlake Audio Studios – Michael Jackson Thriller and Bad
Polar Studios (Stockholm) – ABBA, Led Zeppelin, Genesis, Ramones
Musicland Studios (Munich) – Queen, David Bowie, Deep Purple, Rolling Stones, Giorgio Moroder, ELO, Iggy Pop, Rainbow, Iron Maiden
Rusk studios – The Runaways, Village People, Donna Summer, Laura Brannigan, Elton John
Flyte Tyme – Janet Jackson 'Rhythm Nation', Mariah Carey, Usher
Morgan Studios – The Cure, Gary Moore, Thin Lizzy, Motorhead
Power Plant – Sade, Fine Young Cannibals
TheEndStudios (Lund Sweden) – Billy Cobham, Big Elf, The Knife, Hoffmaestro, Thåstöm, Bob Hund, Bergman Rock, Calle Real
EastSide Sound – Les Paul, Lou Reed, Lee Ranaldo, Sevendust
Utility Muffin Research Kitchen – Frank Zappa
United Western Recorders – Blondie
Smart Studios – Smashing Pumpkins, Garbage, Killdozer, Nirvana
Soundworks Studio – Steely Dan
Redwood Studios – Neil Young
The Automatt – Herbie Hancock

Film & Post
Sony Pictures Entertainment – Pearl Harbor, Spider-Man series, Transformers series, The Simpsons
Universal Studios – U-571, Law & Order, The Revenant
MosFilm (Moscow)
ARRI (Munich)
CinePostproduction (Munich)
Shree Balaji Studio (Mumbai)
Deluxe Toronto (Toronto)

== Company timeline ==
- 1971: Company founder Dave Harrison creates the "in-line" audio console commercialized by MCI
- 1975: Harrison Systems established
- 1975: 3232, the world's first 32-bus, in-line recording console introduced
- 1979: The PP-1 film console introduced
- 1981: MR-2 music recording console introduced
- 1982: MR-3 music recording/TV-3 broadcast console introduced
- 1983: MR-43 music recording/TV-4 introduced
- 1983: HM-5/ live performance SM-5 house monitor and stage monitor introduced
- 1983: Raven music recording console introduced
- 1984: Air-7/Pro-7 on air radio broadcast and production consoles introduced
- 1984: HM-4/SM-4 live performance house monitor and stage monitor consoles introduced
- 1985: SeriesTen, the world's first totally automated console introduced.
- 1986: AIR 790/PRO 790 on air radio broadcast and production consoles introduced
- 1986: "Real time" interactive graphics offered as an option for the SeriesTenB
- 1987: AP-100 on air micro processor controlled radio broadcast console introduced
- 1987: MR-20 music recording introduced
- 1989: Harrison is acquired by GLW Incorporated
- 1989: SeriesTenB with new Mac based automation
- 1990: VIC – "real time" interactive video graphic display/control introduced for SeriesTenB
- 1991: Harrison implements remote, digitally controlled audio
- 1992: MPC, Motion Picture Console introduced
- 1994: SeriesTwelve multi format introduced
- 1995: TV-950 broadcast console introduced
- 1995: Pro-950 production console introduced
- 1996: TV950 honored at NAB as Editors’ Pick of Show for new product introductions
- 1996: Automated, motorized joystick introduced (now patented by Harrison)
- 1998: TV 5.1 TV broadcast console with surround capability introduced
- 1998: LPC, Live Performance Console introduced
- 1998: digital.engine introduced, supporting 512 channels and 160 buss mixing at 40 bit
- 1998: digital.engine MADI router introduced, allowing up to 2240x2240 audio routing
- 2000: Harrison is awarded the patent for automated motorized joystick innovation
- 2001: TVD, Digital Broadcast Console introduced
- 2001: LPC, Digital, Live Performance Console introduced
- 2001: MPC2, Motion Picture Console introduced and honored with nomination for TEC Award
- 2002: TVD-SL, Introduction of the Digital Broadcast Console featuring heads-up displays
- 2002: Pro950EX Production console introduced
- 2002: IKIS, Introduction of the Harrison IKIS Digital Automation Platform
- 2002: MPC3-D, Digital Motion Picture Console upgrade to the IKIS Automation Platform
- 2004: MPC4-D, Introduction of the Digital Motion Picture Console with heads-up displays
- 2004: PreView displays introduced, displaying live audio waveforms from any source (patent pending)
- 2004: DTC Introduction of the Digital Tools Card with Film specific plug-ins
- 2005: Trion introduced, a Digital Audio Console with an analog feel and heads-up displays
- 2005: IKISdirect, DAW controller introduced for Pro Tools and Pyramix
- 2005: Serial Supervisor, redundant control system introduced
- 2006: Xrange, Stand-alone, Native, 64-bit Digital Processing Engine introduced
- 2006: Air 24/7, Small format On-Air console introduced
- 2006: Xdubber, destructive stem recorder for Film introduced
- 2007: IKIS automation on Linux, and Xtools film-specific native processing tools introduced.
- 2008: Trion for Film introduced.
- 2009: Bricasti remote control added to IKISdirect.
- 2009: Mixbus Digital Audio Workstation for Music introduced. (nominated for TEC award)
- 2011: 950m Analog Music Console introduced
- 2013: 950mx Analog Music Console introduced
- 2016: Mixbus32C – a higher-tier version of the Mixbus workstation
- 2018: AVA Plugins (cross-platform compatible AAX/VST/VST3/AU)
- 2023: Harrison is acquired by Solid State Logic
