= Audiotool =

Browser-based music production software

- Audiotool logo
- Website type: Digital audio workstation
- Available in: English
- Owner: Audiotool Inc.
- Website: www.audiotool.com
- Commercial: No
- Registration: Required to publish, comment
- Users: Approx. 2,000,000
- Launched: February 24, 2008
- Current status: Online
- Content license: CC or All Rights Reserved
- Written in: Rust
- CEO Andreas Jacobi

Audiotool is a free, browser-based music production software and distribution platform developed in Germany. It allows users to remix and collaborate on tracks in real-time. Users can create and publish their music tracks onto the site using Creative Commons licenses or All Rights Reserved. Until 2010, Audiotool was part of Hobnox, a content distribution/publication website specialising in music, fashion and indie culture. In mid-2013, Audiotool had 500000 users, 200000 tracks and the total of 44 million plays on all tracks combined In 2026, the online Digital Audio Workstation (DAW) was relaunched and included Audiotool NEXUS, an open developer platform that enables creators to build extensions on top of Audiotool.

The platform debuted in 2010 using Flash technology and was redeveloped in HTML5 in 2017. The 2026 version was built on Rust with real-time collaborative features, including cross-device synchronization between desktop and mobile versions. NEXUS is Audiotool's open projects API, built on Protocol Buffers. It defines every entity and action in the DAW: from devices and cables to effects, automation, and more and is the same API the app uses internally. It gives full read/write access to all tracks in a project with full context for AI tools that get connected to a project.

Audiotool was created to make music production accessible and free for everyone. André Michelle's early work included pioneering an audio hack in 2005 for audio stream generation ahead of browser support, and the emulation of the iconic Roland TR-909 in 2007. He also introduced the infinite desktop concept, enabling users to intuitively place and wire plugins with virtual cables. These efforts contributed to establishing the platform's core functionalities and guiding its development until his departure in 2023.

== Demo Version ==
The 'Hobnox Audiotool Demo,' released on February 24, 2008, served as a proof of concept, demonstrating that digital signal processing (DSP) could be executed within a browser. This initial demonstration laid the groundwork for what Audiotool would become, showing the possibilities for online music production ahead of adding capabilities like saving and community features.

== Audiotool 1.0 Firestarter ==
Two years later, after a flurry of updates, the application broke out of beta with a new polyphonic synthesizer and a partnership with LoopMasters to provide samples within the program. Tracks could be published to the new Audiotool community, or worked on privately and saved for extended periods. Options were created for other users to remix tracks, depending on the licenses the original artist specified.

== Audiotool 1.1 Ping Pong ==
Later in the same year, after input from the community, the 1.1 update features included the ability to download tracks (MP3/Vorbis), an embed player, the ability to create drafts (even when remixing tracks), create templates, track cover images, and performance enhancements.

Following updates allowed dragging samples directly from the library to the desktop, and included a new two channel Crossfader, the revolutionary Rasselbock effect device, auto-connected devices, a sample-based drum machine, and an improved sample browser.

== Audiotool 2.0 ==
About one year from the launch of 1.0 Firestarter, Audiotool 2.0 was launched in collaboration with Burn-Studios and included a feature to import samples, recording from the timeline, a new 16-track mixer, and MIDI support. A following update in April 2012 included 5 new plugins, a phase modulation synthesizer, and ability to save device presets. Also, the July 2013 update allowed users to collaborate on tracks.

== Audiotool Next 1.0 ==
February 2015, a major update was officially announced that would convert the application from Flash to HTML5, offering live collaboration and other new features yet to be announced. Later that year, some features announced included audio/video chat and a detachable timeline. The beta has been released to certain users of the site if they request for the beta on the homepage. On October 1, 2018, Audiotool Next was publicly released.

== Audiotool 3.0 and Audiotool NEXUS (2026) ==
In January 2026, Audiotool launched an open beta of the redesigned cloud-based digital audio workstation (DAW) known as ''Audiotool Studio''. The new version introduced enhanced multiplayer collaboration features and the NEXUS developer platform, an open API and open-source software development kit (SDK) designed to allow third-party developers to create music-production tools, instruments, effects, AI-powered services, and workflow extensions that operate within Audiotool sessions.

Audiotool NEXUS provides programmatic access to the platform's audio engine, signal processing, routing, MIDI, automation, and plugin state management systems, enabling developers to integrate custom tools into live collaborative music-production environments.

== Let's Build! Hackathon Initiative (2026) ==
In May 2026, Audiotool announced ''Let's Build!'', a global hackathon series focused on music software development and creative technology. The initiative encouraged musicians, developers, and students to create music applications, games, virtual instruments, and DAW extensions using the Audiotool NEXUS SDK and AI-assisted coding tools (vibe-coding). The program ran online with partner universities hosting in-person hackathon sprints and meetups. Participants competed for prizes from a prize pool worth $70,000+. Hackathon events for NEXUS were organized through 2026 in collaboration with BBC Research & Development and Music Hackspace. A hackathon was hosted at Berklee College of Music's AIMS Summit.

== Gaming and Esports Partnerships around Music Contests (2024-2026) ==
The platform established partnerships with the Esports World Cup (EWC) and Esports Nations Cup (ENC), gaining users within the gaming community. The collaborative format that is allowing drop-in participation and real-time creative contribution, became established within this user base. Audiotool & EWC contests took place in 2024, 2025 and 2026.

== Website features ==
=== Devices ===
Audiotool includes:

- Gakki, curated sound library device for natural and organic sounds
- The Roland TR-808
- The Roland TR-909
- The Roland TB-303
- The Tenori-on
- The Machiniste, a sample based drum machine
- The Heisenberg, a phase modulation synthesizer
- The Pulverisateur, a polyphonic synthesizer
- The Space, A spectral synthesizer
- The ToneMatrix, a pattern-oriented synthesizer
- WaveShaper, a drawable transfer curve for designing custom distortion shapes.

it also includes various effect pedals, which can simulate:

- Dynamic range compression
- Graphic equalizer
- Exciter(effect)
- Stereo Enhancer
- Bit depth reduction
- Digital delay
- Flange
- Parametric equalization
- Phasing
- Pitched digital delay
- Reverb
- Filters including (Lowpass, Highpass, Notch, Bandpass) and a separate Auto-Filter
- Stereo detunization (which produces a sort of chorus effect)
- Distortion

=== Samples ===
Audiotool has a robust library of samples available to users on the site.

With the release of Audiotool Next in 2018, sample upload privileges were reinstated to users, under the condition that they signed terms and conditions disallowing redistributions of royalty free samples or any sample that had copyright infringements.

Audiotool is partnered with Loopmasters and New Loops, companies which provide samples to the sample library.

Audiotool has a built-in sample editor known as Probe that allows users to modify and upload samples up to 30 seconds in length. Inside the studio editor, there is an option to bounce the timeline, which allows users to upload the music they have worked on in the editor to Probe, where it can be uploaded to the sample library.

=== Presets ===
On all devices, users have the option to save their current configuration of the device to a preset, which can be set to private or public.

There are over 200,000 device presets that have been created by users.

=== Additional Tools ===
- Probe: A built-in sample editor that supports importing and recording audio in various formats, offering effects like EQ, fading, and normalization for detailed audio editing.

== Awards ==
- German IPTV Award - Winner, Category "Creative Design", 2008
- Grimme Online Award - Winner, Category "Special", 2008
- Flashforward Award - Winner, Category "Sound", 2008
- red dot award - "Best of the Best" Category "Communication Design", 2008
- LEADAWARDS - "Webcommunity of the Year", 2008
- Webby Awards "Daily Honoree" Category "Music" - 2008
- eco Internet Award - "Nominee" Category "Content Distribution Platform", 2008
- World Summit Award Germany - "Winner", "E-Entertainment and Games", 2009
- LEADAWARDS - Winner "Silver" Category "Internet TV of the Year", 2009
