= Samplitude =

Digital audio workstation

- Developer: Boris FX
- Stable release: Version 2025 (August 2025)
- Operating system: Windows 10 and 11
- Type: Digital audio workstation
- License: Proprietary
- Website: borisfx.com/products/samplitude/

Samplitude is a computer program made by Boris FX for recording, editing, mixing, mastering and outputting audio. The first version was released in 1992 for the Amiga and three years later for Microsoft Windows. The latest version of the software is Samplitude 2025. Samplitude is an example of a digital audio workstation (DAW).

== Features ==
Samplitude is like most DAWs in that it allows the user to:

- Record and manipulate multitrack digital audio
- Record and manipulate MIDI data
- Apply effects, such as reverb and delay, some versions of Samplitude come bundled with effects
- Automate the process of mixing audio
- Utilize virtual instruments, such as software synthesizers, software samplers, software drum machines
- Connect to other multimedia applications with sample accuracy via ReWire

Samplitude uses the term "objects" for what other DAWs call "clips" (eg. Pro Tools) or "items" (eg. REAPER). In Samplitude, an "object" is a graphical representation of a piece of audio or MIDI data that appears on a Track in the Arranger window. If the object is an audio object, it will look like a standard graphic of a .wav file. If the object is a MIDI object, it will appear as a series of square dots that represent the MIDI notes contained therein. Through the Object Editor, various controls and effects (Pan, Volume, Invert Phase, Timestretch, Pitchshift, VST plugins, Magix Plugins, etc.) can be applied at the Object level as opposed to being applied at the Track level.

Objects can be created in Samplitude either by importing them or by recording. Objects created by recording appear as a continuous, unbroken rectangle on the track. However, objects can also be "split", creating multiple smaller objects from a larger one, or "glued", which combines multiple smaller objects into one larger one.

Samplitude Pro X2 Suite also includes a variety of high-quality built-in effects, including the AM-munition Compressor/Limiter, the AM-Suite (Analogue Modeling Suite), and Vandal (Guitar and Bass Amp simulator). Samplitude also includes the essentialFX Suite, which are 10 plug-ins using high quality algorithms that have low resource demands. Samplitude Pro X2 Suite also includes the Independence Sampler Workstation that includes 70GB of content (Samplitude Pro X2 only 12GB).

== History ==
In 1992 the first version of Samplitude, written for the Amiga platform, was completed. It was mainly a sample editor with 24-bit audio processing. One year later, Samplitude Pro II came with hard disk recording.

In 1995 Samplitude was released for Microsoft Windows 3.1. Three versions were available:

- Multimedia (four tracks) with virtual editing, real-time surround effect, integration of MIDI and AVI
- Pro (8 tracks) like Multimedia Version plus features such as resampling, timestretching, pitch-shifting, MIDI sample dump
- Studio (16 tracks) like Pro Version plus features such as external sync and various digital filters

In 1998 Samplitude 2496 was released, at the time owned by German audio company SEK'D (formerly Hohner Midia). It supported 24-bit recording at sample rates up to 96 kHz. Samplitude was unique at that time, being able to record audio to hard disk and RAM. Simultaneously less expensive but limited versions of Samplitude called Red Roaster and Samplitude Studio were released for Windows 95/98 and NT4. Red Roaster's name being derived from the Red Book standard to which it conforms, included only the CD-burning features of Samplitude. The last releases still in version 5 were in June 1999 after which SEK'D sold the Samplitude line to MAGIX.

Samplitude Professional 7.0 was released at the end of 2002. This version included support for ASIO drivers, VST plug-ins (including VST Instruments) with plug-in delay compensation, and hardware control surfaces. It came with complete video recording, editing and authoring software.

In 2005 Version 8.0 was released. Some of the new features were the ability to act as a ReWire host, 5.1 surround mixing, analogue-style processors, a virtual drum machine and an Acid-style beat-mapping tool.

In 2006 MAGIX presented Samplitude 9.0 with advanced dual CPU support, VSTi manager, de-esser and more ergonomic track handling.

Released Summer 2011, Samplitude Pro X made the hardware dongle optional, switched to 64-bit operation, included a new soft sampler, introduced window docking and introduced spectral editing.

Samplitude Pro X2 introduced VCA faders, routing single tracks to multiple outputs, zPlane Elastique time-stretching algorithms were introduced. Pro X2 also introduced support for VST3.0 plugin format. DN-e1, an analog synthesizer was added.

Samplitude Pro X3 updated Samplitude's tempo warp functionality, introduced Melodyne support via the ARA plugin format which provides deep integration in Samplitude. Samplitude Pro X4 comes bundled with Sound Forge Pro 11 as well as Izotope's Mastering and Repair Suite.

== See also ==
- Ableton Live
- ACID Pro
- Ardour
- Digital Performer
- FL Studio
- Logic Pro
- Pro Tools
- Steinberg Cubase
- Studio One (software)
- REAPER
- Cakewalk Sonar
