= GoldWave =

Digital audio editor and recording application

- Original author: Chris Craig (GoldWave 1.0)
- Developer: GoldWave Inc.
- Initial release: April 28, 1993; 32 years ago
- Stable release: 7.04 / February 3, 2026; 40 days ago
- Operating system: GoldWave: Microsoft Windows, iOS 11.0 (up to 1.0.40), Android 6.0 (up to 1.0.36 (2020-07-31 build)), Mac OS 11.0 with Apple M1-compatible processor GoldWave Infinity: web-based (supports Microsoft Windows, Linux, Mac OS X, Android, iOS)
- Type: Digital audio editor
- License: Shareware
- Website: www.goldwave.com/goldwave.php

GoldWave is a commercial digital audio editing software product developed by GoldWave Inc, first released to the public in April 1993.

== Goldwave product lines ==
- GoldWave: Audio editor for Microsoft Windows, iOS, Android. iOS version runs on Mac OS 11 with Apple M1-compatible processor.
- GoldWave Infinity: Web browser-based audio editor that also supports Linux, Mac OS X, Android, iOS.

== Features ==
GoldWave has an array of features bundled which define the program. They include:

- Real-time graphic visuals, such as bar, waveform, spectrogram, spectrum, and VU meter.
- Basic and advanced effects and filters such as noise reduction, compressor/expander, volume shaping, volume matcher, pitch, reverb, resampling, and parametric EQ.
- Effect previewing
- Saving and restoring effect presets
- DirectX Audio plug-in support
- A variety of audio file formats are supported, including WAV, MP3, Windows Media Audio, Ogg, FLAC, AIFF, AU, Monkey's Audio, VOX, mat, snd, and voc
- Batch processing and conversion support for converting a set of files to a different format and applying effects
- Multiple undo levels
- Edit multiple files at once
- Support for editing large files
- Storage option available to use RAM

== GoldWave ==
=== Supported versions and compatibility ===
==== Windows ====
A version prior to the version 5 series still exists for download of its shareware version at the official website.

Versions up to 3.03 are 16-bit applications and cannot run in 64-bit versions of Windows).

All versions up to 4.26 can run on any 32-bit Windows operating system.

Starting with version 5, the minimum supported operating system is changed to Windows ME. However, the requirements listed in the software package's HTML documentation was not updated.

Starting with version 5.03, minimum hardware requirements were increased to Pentium III of 700 (500 in FAQ)MHz and DirectX 8 are now part of the minimum system requirements compared to the Pentium II of 300 MHz and DirectX 5 required by previous versions.

Windows ME are supported up to 5.25. Windows 98 works, but not officially supported. The 5.09 announcement claimed Windows 98 does not work starting in 2005-01-29 (previously claimed unsupported as late as 2 days earlier), but the feature was restored in 5.10.

Beginning with 5.51, Windows 98 and ME are not supported.

Beginning with 6.00, minimum supported operating system is Windows 7 64-bit.

==== Linux ====
Prior to GoldWave Infinity, GoldWave version 5 was supported via a Wine compatibility layer.

==== Android ====
Original test version was announced in 2019-07-30.

The last release of GoldWave was 1.0.36, which is also the first production version, then it was replaced by GoldWave Infinity.

==== iOS ====
Original test version was announced in 2019-10-09.

The last version announced in publisher's web site was 1.0.39, which is also the first production version. The last released version was 1.0.40, then it was replaced by GoldWave Infinity.

=== Reception ===
- GoldWave was used to analyze historic recordings from the Moon landing, including establishing the "missing word" from astronaut Neil Armstrong's famous line.
- Adam Young (aka Owl City) used GoldWave to record all his vocals on his first major label album Ocean Eyes.
- The videogame Megaman X 4 features English audio recorded using GoldWave.
- The videogame Half-Life uses audio edited with GoldWave (most notably the Black Mesa Announcement System known as VOX, the HECU voices, most of the sound effects and a few voicelines).
- The 2010 album Chuck Person's Eccojams Vol. 1 by American musician Daniel Lopatin is composed of collages of slowed-down looped samples of songs of the 1980s and 1990s; many of them were initially created at his office job in GoldWave.

== See also ==
- Audacity
- List of music software
