= Mp3DirectCut =

Audio editor

mp3DirectCut

- Editing audio in mp3DirectCut
- Developer: Martin Pesch
- Stable release: 2.40 / March 2026
- Operating system: Windows; Linux (Wine) officially supported
- Type: Digital audio editor
- License: Freeware
- Website: mpesch3.de

mp3DirectCut is a lossless editor for MP3 (and to a degree, MP2 and AAC) audio files, able to provide cuts and crops, copy and paste, gain and fades to audio files without having to decode or re-encode the audio. By modifying the global gain field of each frame of MPEG audio, the volume of that frame can be modified without altering the audio data itself. This allows for rapid, lossless MP3 audio editing that does not degrade the data from re-encoding. mp3DirectCut provides audio normalization and pause (silence) detection, and can split long recordings into separate files based on cue points in the audio, such as those provided by pause detection. mp3DirectCut can also record audio directly to MP3 from the computer's sound card input.

All audio operations are performed using frame manipulation so, as such, mp3DirectCut is not a waveform editor. Audio clean-up such as click, hiss and noise removal is not possible.

== Features ==
- An MP3 file can be edited without transcoding.
- Cut, copy, paste, and volume change operations are provided; edits can be previewed, including a command that plays a segment without a selected region (previewing a cut)
- Audio normalization and pause detection
- MP3 recording with ACM or LAME encoder (not bundled)
- Fast MP3 visualization
- Supports Layer 2 (DVD/DVB audio)
- Includes a tag editor for ID3v1 tags
- Cue sheet support with auto cue (track division by time values)
- Track splitting with filename and ID3v1.1 tag creation
- VU meter, bitrate visualization
- Supported on all versions of Microsoft Windows from 95 through 7; certain modes can be invoked from the command line
- Unobtrusive: The installation file (as of October 2020) is 303 Kbytes; the installed program occupies a single directory (with one subdirectory for non-English help files, which can be deleted if not needed); the program does not modify the Windows Registry; a user's manual and a page of Frequently Asked Questions is included in the installation
- The edited file can be used as a ringtone on mobile phones
- Newer versions can also edit raw AAC audio files

== Limitations ==
Granularity limitations

- Edit positions in the file can be placed only at the start of an MP3 frame (of which there are typically about 38 per second).
- Gains and fades are limited to 1.5 dB steps, as they are achieved by modifying the value of the MP3 frame's 8-bit global gain field.

Size limitations

- The maximum file size that the program is able to process is 4 GB. This is equivalent to about 28 hours of music in an MP3 file encoded at 320 kbit/s.

Unimplemented features

- ID3v2 tags cannot be read, and if they are written out, they contain the incorrect song length if the length is modified.
- The documentation warns that navigating a song does not, in all cases, land on the start of an MP3 frame. The documentation does not guarantee correct results in all cases.
- The documentation is adequate but does not cover all cases.

Possible introduction of error

- Increasing the audio volume can lead to distortion if, on playback, multiplying the audio data by the global gain may increase the volume past its clipping threshold. Audio recordings that use Compressed audio to cap the overall volume may have already adjusted the global gain field. This may limit the ability to further amplify the recording with MP3DirectCut without causing clipping.

AAC/MP4

- To work on AAC files, an extra library (libfaad2.dll) needs to be installed
- Raw AAC audio is supported, but not AAC audio inside MP4 container files
- If MP4 audio files need to be processed, the AAC audio stream needs to be extracted first, e.g. with mp4box (Simply renaming an .MP4 file to .AAC does not work, since a simply renamed file still contains an MP4 container file header).

== Reviews ==
- http://www.softpedia.com/get/Multimedia/Audio/Audio-Editors-Recorders/mp3DirectCut.shtml
- https://www.fosshub.com/mp3DirectCut.html
- http://www.techspot.com/downloads/530-mp3directcut.html

== See also ==
- MP3Gain, a lossless multi-platform MP3 global gain normalizer using ReplayGain.
