= Sonoma Wire Works =

American audio technology company

Sonoma Wire Works is a company, based in Los Altos, California, and incorporated in 2003, that develops audio software and hardware.

Sonoma Wire Works began in an outbuilding in Sonoma County, California. Three audio engineers (Doug Wright, Daniel Walton, and David Tremblay), who worked in the audio industry for over 20 years combined, wanted to create an easy and fun recording application for guitarists. The result of their work was RiffWorks guitar recording software with built-in InstantDrummer, effects, online collaboration, song posting, and more. Hayden Bursk joined the development team after graduating from the Center for Computer Research in Music and Acoustics (CCRMA) at Stanford University. RiffWorks development has continued with additional features being added, the launch of RiffWorks T4 free recording software, and the new RiffWorld.com online community for RiffWorks users. Nine employees now work at Sonoma Wire Works.

In 2004, Sonoma Wire Works launched their first product, RiffWorks recording software for Mac and Windows, which is designed for use by guitar players. Over the next few years, RiffLink online music collaboration was built into RiffWorks, and song posting to Sonoma Wire Works' RiffWorld.com online community was added. In addition, over 100 RiffWorks InstantDrummer Sessions were launched.

In 2008, Sonoma Wire Works become an iOS application development company with the launch of the FourTrack multitrack recorder for musicians who want to capture musical ideas and record songs on their iPhone.

In 2009, Sonoma Wire Works acquired software and drum content from Submersible Music and Discrete Drums, including DrumCore, a plug-in drum instrument (VSTi/RTAS/AU) with stereo audio loops and MIDI recordings of well-known drummers; KitCore, a plug-in based on the MIDI drum instrument in DrumCore; and the Discrete Drums multitrack recording libraries.

In 2010, Sonoma Wire Works developed the StudioTrack audio recorder for the iPad, and the GuitarJack audio interface for FourTrack, StudioTrack, GuitarTone, and other compatible iOS apps.

In 2022, Sonoma Wire Works announced the discontinuation of sales and support for all of their products.
