= Harrison Mixbus =

Digital audio workstation

Mixbus
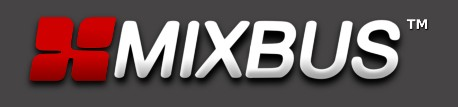
- Developers: Harrison Audio, Ardour contributors
- Stable release: 11.0.289 / April 2025; 1 year ago
- Operating system: Windows, macOS, Linux
- Type: Digital audio workstation
- Website: mixbus.harrisonconsoles.com

Harrison Mixbus is a digital audio workstation (DAW) released in 2009, compatible with Microsoft Windows, macOS, and Linux. It is built on the open-source DAW Ardour but includes additional features developed by Harrison Audio, such as analog-modeled EQ, compression, summing on channel strips, and a master bus with limiter and loudness monitoring tools.

== Features of Mixbus ==
Mixbus has the features of Ardour, with additional functionality from proprietary DSP, replicating the workflow, signal path, and sound of a Harrison console.

Each channel strip in Mixbus features analog modeled 3 bands EQ (including a high pass filter), compression (with 3 compressor types), panning, and summing.

It includes 8 stereo mixbuses featuring tone controls, tape saturation, and compression (including a sidechain compressor).

The master bus is similar to the mix buses but has the addition of a limiter, a K14 meter for loudness monitoring, and a stereo correlation meter.

Mixbus started as an audio-only workstation. In earlier versions, it also depended on the JACK audio server as its backend. Since version 3, Mixbus supports both audio and MIDI tracks, and it no longer depends on JACK, although JACK can still be used as one of its audio backends.

== See also ==
- List of MIDI editors and sequencers
