= Tracktion Waveform =

Software for recording and editing audio

Waveform
- Developer: Tracktion Software Company
- Initial release: 2002; 24 years ago
- Stable release: 13.5 / July 10, 2025; 8 months ago
- Operating system: macOS, Microsoft Windows, Linux, Raspberry Pi
- Type: Digital audio workstation
- License: Proprietary
- Website: www.tracktion.com

Waveform, previously known as Tracktion, is a digital audio workstation for recording and editing audio and MIDI. The software is cross-platform, and runs on Apple macOS, Microsoft Windows, Linux, and Raspberry Pi. It is freemium software, offering a free version with standard features (Waveform Free) and a paid version with more advanced features and additional content (Waveform Pro). It also offers paid feature expansion packs with selections of features from the paid version.

== History ==
Tracktion was developed by independent UK designer/programmer Julian Storer and was released in 2002 by UK-based Raw Material Software. In 2004, US-based Mackie, a division of LOUD Technologies specializing in studio recording and live sound products, took over the distribution of Tracktion. It was sold in standalone, boxed retail versions and bundled with Mackie, Tapco, and Echo Audio computer-audio interfaces and digital-capable mixing boards.

Around the late 2000s/early 2010s, although no official word came from Mackie, the users' understanding was that Tracktion had been discontinued as the company had issued no updates, communication, or announcements on it since January 2008. However, at the January 2013 NAMM Show, Tracktion's original developer Julian Storer announced he had reacquired control of the software and would continue developing Tracktion with his new Tracktion Software Corporation.

In 2017, Tracktion Software Corporation rebranded the DAW to be called Waveform.

== User interface, workflow, and unique features ==
Waveform was designed to be transparent and intuitive. Track object controls and parameters are context-sensitive; effects, MIDI instruments, and other software objects can be added to tracks or applied directly to individual audio and MIDI clips using a drag-and-drop system of filters. Complex chains of filters can be created, stored, and recalled for later use as rack effects, analogous to a saved channel strip settings in a traditional DAW/sequencer.

Waveform, as Tracktion, represented a move away from the modal dialog boxes, multiple menus, and cluttered windows common to legacy MIDI sequencers and digital audio workstations, in favor of a streamlined, single-screen approach that presented the user with minimal options at any time. In this way, Waveform is similar to Ableton Live, but while the latter has two separate work areas (Session and Arrange), Waveform has fully context-sensitive windows that automatically appear or hide depending on the current task or can be manually togged. Both are also noted for their more abstract visual styles, in contrast to the photorealistic style of other interfaces (like Reason) which imitate the appearance of real world recording equipment and effects units.

It also supports user customization of keyboard shortcuts, coding custom shortcuts, and modifying the color scheme, similar to Cockos’s REAPER.

== Open source library ==
The underlying C++ code developed to create Tracktion's graphic and audio capabilities was later released as an open-source library, JUCE.

== See also ==
- Comparison of multitrack recording software
- List of music software
