= Core Audio =

Low level API in Apple operating systems

- Developer(s): Apple Inc.
- Initial release: 2003
- Stable release: 3.2.6
- Operating system: macOS, iOS
- Type: Developer library
- License: Proprietary
- Website: https://developer.apple.com/documentation/coreaudio

Core Audio is a low-level API for dealing with sound in Apple's macOS and iOS operating systems. It includes an implementation of the cross-platform OpenAL.

Apple's Core Audio documentation states that "in creating this new architecture on Mac OS X, Apple's objective in the audio space has been twofold. The primary goal is to deliver a high-quality, superior audio experience for Macintosh users. The second objective reflects a shift in emphasis from developers having to establish their own audio and MIDI protocols in their applications to Apple moving ahead to assume responsibility for these services on the Macintosh platform."

== History ==
It was introduced in Mac OS X 10.0 (Cheetah).

== Architecture ==
Core Audio supports plugins, which can generate, receive, or process audio streams; these plugins are packaged as a bundle with the extension .component.

== See also ==
- Audio Units
- Core Foundation
- PulseAudio
