= Audio Units =

API for audio software in macOS and iOS

Audio Units (AU) are a system-level plug-in architecture provided by Core Audio in Apple's macOS and iOS operating systems. Audio Units are a set of application programming interface (API) services provided by the operating system to generate, process, receive, or otherwise manipulate streams of audio in near-real-time with minimal latency. It may be thought of as Apple's architectural equivalent to another popular plug-in format, Steinberg's Virtual Studio Technology (VST).

Because of the many similarities between Audio Units and VST, several commercial and free wrapping technologies are available (e.g. Symbiosis and FXpansion VST-AU Adapter). Celemony Software and PreSonus have also developed the Audio Random Access (ARA) extension, which works with both AU and VST, allowing greater integration between the plug-ins and DAW software.

== Use ==
Audio Units allows sound file audio time stretching and pitch scaling (e.g., timestretch), sample rate conversion, and streaming over a local area network. It also comes with a set of AU plug-ins such as EQ filters, dynamic processors, delay, reverb, and a Soundbank Synthesizer Instrument.

AU are used by Apple applications such as GarageBand, Logic Pro, Final Cut Pro, MainStage, Soundtrack Pro (discontinued), and most 3rd party audio software developed for macOS such as Ableton Live, Amadeus Pro, Ardour, Audio Hijack, DaVinci Resolve, Digital Performer, Gig Performer, REAPER, and Studio One.

== Competing technologies ==
- Avid's Avid Audio eXtension (a successor to the RTAS format)
- Digidesign's Real Time AudioSuite (now obsolete)
- LADSPA and Disposable Soft Synth Interface (DSSI) for Linux
- LV2 (crossplatform successor to LADSPA)
- Microsoft's DirectX
- Steinberg's Virtual Studio Technology
