= Real-Time AudioSuite =

Audio plug-in format developed by Digidesign

- Developer: Digidesign (now Avid)
- Operating system: macOS, Windows
- Type: Plug-in Architecture
- License: Proprietary
- Website: Avid Audio Plug-In Developer Program

Real-Time AudioSuite (RTAS) is an audio plug-in format developed by Digidesign, currently Avid Technology, for their Pro Tools LE and Pro Tools M-Powered systems, although they can be run on Pro Tools HD and Pro Tools TDM systems. RTAS plug-ins use the processing power of the host computer rather than DSP cards used in the Pro Tools HD systems. As the name suggests, the plug-in architecture is designed to be run in real-time, mimicking hardware inserts on traditional mixing console. This is in contrast to rendering files out of time with effects applied directly to the audio, which in Pro Tools is facilitated by AudioSuite Plug-ins. Avid's AAX format, which runs on both native CPU and Pro Tools HDX DSP, is the replacement for RTAS.

== Obsolescence ==
On April 7, 2013, Avid announced Pro Tools 11. From this version forward, Avid has made the AAX plug-in the only format supported by Pro Tools. At launch, many third-party plug-in developers have yet to port their software to the new AAX format, so Avid will sell Pro Tools 11 with both an 11 and 10 license, allowing users to run Pro Tools 10.3.8, which is the last version that will support RTAS.

== Licensing ==
Most plug-ins employ some form of copy protection, notably the PACE iLok dongle. Though there are some plug-ins available free of charge, there is no accompanying source code or programming documentation available to the general public.

Developers must contact Avid for the SDK. There are terms of disclosure on releasing information about Avid's development materials, making official RTAS development incompatible with open-source software.

== Virtual Studio Technology Rewrapping ==
FXpansion Audio produces a VST to RTAS converter which allows the use of plug-ins developed under Steinberg's development environment inside of Pro Tools, expanding the DAW's processing capabilities.

FXpansion has stated that an RTAS to VST converter can not happen "for both technical and legal reasons."

== Competing technologies ==
- Apple Inc.'s Audio Units
- LADSPA, DSSI and LV2 for Linux
- Microsoft's DirectX
- Steinberg's Virtual Studio Technology
