= Disposable Soft Synth Interface =

Software synthesizer plugin architecture

- Type: API library
- Website: dssi.sourceforge.net

Disposable Soft Synth Interface (DSSI) is a virtual instrument (software synthesizer) plugin architecture for use by music sequencer applications. It was designed for applications running under Linux, although there is nothing specific to Linux in the interface itself. It is distributed under the terms of a combination of LGPL-2.1-or-later and some BSD licenses, all of which are free software licences.

== Features ==
DSSI is sometimes described as Linux Audio Developer's Simple Plugin API (LADSPA) for instruments. LADSPA is an audio effect plugin architecture for filters, reverbs and other sound processing software tools, whereas DSSI was designed specifically for instrument plugins that generate sound from note events. DSSI extends LADSPA by adding note event delivery, but it also adds predefined program selections and a method for plugins to provide their own user interfaces, both of which may also be used by effects plugins. This is partly because DSSI was intended to be a lightweight addition to LADSPA that would require little extra effort from authors of LADSPA hosts and plugins to support, and partly to avoid distracting too much developer effort from the Generalized Music Plug-in Interface (GMPI) plug-in initiative (which has since stalled). Perhaps as a partial consequence of this early offhand approach to publicity, the number of DSSI plugins available remains small. A successor which reunites the two standards LADSPA and DSSI is LV2.

DSSI hosts on Linux can also host some Virtual Studio Technology (VST) instruments (VSTi) for Microsoft Windows using the dssi-vst wrapper plug-in, which in turn makes use of the Wine compatibility layer. The major programs supporting DSSI are Qtractor, Renoise and Rosegarden.

== See also ==
- Free audio software
