= LADSPA =

Application programming interface for audio filters

Linux Audio Developer's Simple Plugin API
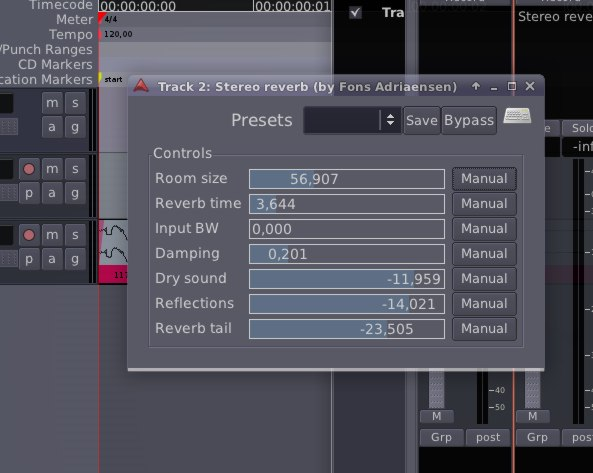
- A Stereo Reverb LADSPA plugin running inside Ardour Digital Audio Workstation on Linux
- Developer(s): Richard W.E. Furse, Paul Barton-Davis, Stefan Westerfeld
- Stable release: 1.17 / 9 September 2021; 3 years ago
- Written in: C
- Operating system: Cross-platform
- License: LGPL-2.1-or-later
- Website: ladspa.org

The Linux Audio Developer's Simple Plugin API (LADSPA) is an application programming interface (API) standard for handling audio filters and audio signal processing effects, licensed under LGPL-2.1-or-later. Originally designed through consensus on the Linux Audio Developers mailing list, it now works on a variety of platforms. It is used in many free audio software projects, and there is a wide range of LADSPA plug-ins available.

LADSPA exists primarily as a header file written in the programming language C.

There are many audio plugin standards and most major modern software synthesizers and sound editors support a variety. The best known standard is probably Steinberg's Virtual Studio Technology. LADSPA is unusual in that it attempts to provide only the "Greatest Common Divisor" of other standards. This means that its scope is limited, but it is simple and plugins written using it are easy to embed in many other programs. The standard has changed little with time, so compatibility problems are rare.

DSSI extends LADSPA to cover instrument plugins.

LV2 is a successor, based on LADSPA and DSSI, but permitting easy extensibility, allowing custom user interfaces, MIDI messages, and custom extensions.

== Competing technologies ==
- Apple Inc.'s Audio Units
- Digidesign's Real Time AudioSuite
- Avid Technology's Avid Audio eXtension
- Microsoft's DirectX plugin
- Steinberg's Virtual Studio Technology
- CLever Audio Plug-in (Open Source)
