= WaveLab =

Digital audio editor and recording software

- Developer: Steinberg
- Stable release: 12 / January 24, 2024; 22 months ago
- Written in: C/C++
- Operating system: Microsoft Windows, macOS
- Available in: English, German, French, Spanish, Italian, Japanese
- Type: Digital audio editor
- License: Proprietary
- Website: www.steinberg.net/wavelab/

WaveLab is a digital audio editor and recording computer software application for Windows and macOS, created by Steinberg. WaveLab was started in 1995 and it is mainly the work of one programmer, Philippe Goutier.

Audio can be edited as a single file, a series of files or a multitrack "montage". It fully supports VST 2 and 3 plugins for audio processing. Cut-down versions of WaveLab are available as WaveLab Elements and WaveLab LE.

== Features and usage ==
In addition to recording audio from multiple sources, WaveLab can be used for post-processing of all types of audio. It is popularly used for mastering audio, but also facilitates basic usage such as editing podcasts.

- Single-window dockable user interface with multiple themes, fully scalable
- Maximum sample rate of 384 kHz and bit depth of 32-bit floating point
- Encodes, imports and allows editing metadata of various file formats such as WAV, FLAC, OGG, AIFF, MP3 and AAC
- DDP (Disc Description Protocol) and included shareable DDP Player
- Offline loudness analysis (EBU-compliant)
- Extensive batch processing features and scripting
- Render button to render changes to sound files while they are playing
- Spectrum Editor with various display settings and editing tools
- "Audio Inpainting" to recreate missing content by analyzing the surrounding area
- Visualizers such as a spectrometer, phase scope and wave scope
- Real-time spectrogram for playback and monitored signals
- Mid/Side viewing, processing and editing
- Modern time-stretching and pitch-shifting algorithms
- Folder watching for automatic offline processing
- Full integration of external effects hardware
- Master Section with effect slots, re-sampling, master level, final effects/dithering, playback processing and speaker configuration
- Direct exchange and ASIO driver sharing with Cubase and Nuendo
- Various effects and processors including the MasterRig and RestoreRig plug-in bundles, and offline processors

== See also ==
- Steinberg Cubase
- Nuendo
