= Digital Performer =

Digital audio workstation and sequencer

- Developer: MOTU
- Stable release: 11.35 / August 2025; 1 year ago
- Operating system: Mac OS X Microsoft Windows
- Type: MIDI sequencer + digital audio workstation
- License: Proprietary
- Website: www.motu.com/products/software/dp/

Digital Performer is a digital audio workstation and music sequencer software package published by Mark of the Unicorn (MOTU) of Cambridge, Massachusetts for the Apple Macintosh and Microsoft Windows platforms.

== Ancestry ==
In 1984, Mark of the Unicorn released Professional Composer, one of the first application programs for the Apple Macintosh. The program used the Macintosh's high-resolution graphics and printing to allow the user to print professional quality music scores.

In 1985, the company released a music sequencer named Performer, also based on the Macintosh platform, for arranging and performing with synthesizers and other devices which recognized the then-newly developed MIDI standard. Sending a series of numerical values, such a sequencer could direct many instruments, commanding which notes to play, at what loudness, and for how long to sustain them. There are many deep features in the MIDI protocol; MOTU developed extended capabilities in Digital Performer for handling these controllers and other actions (including remote operation of the software itself) through user-customizable graphical consoles, allowing the operator direct access to deeper features of instruments, stage lighting and various types of machines, all via MIDI interfaces and custom graphic buttons and sliders.

== Digital Audio Workstation (DAW) ==
In 1990, MOTU added the ability to synchronise audio (digital audio) to Performer and released it as "Digital Performer," months after Opcode added this capability to Vision. Digital Performer was originally designed as a front-end to Digidesign's Audiomedia hard disk recording system, which later became Pro Tools. Digital Performer's specific appeal was its MIDI environment, which was fitted into the same transport system as the audio environment. This enabled users to record their MIDI instruments and mix the results with other live audio recorded in the studio (or vice versa). Personal computers of this time were too slow to handle high quality recording via their own CPU, so the addition of Digital signal processing co-processor cards was necessary to create a functioning audio recording studio. As the Mac's CPU became powerful enough to record the digitized audio directly to hard disk, the DSP cards were gradually rendered unnecessary. Foreseeing this, MOTU created its own Motu Audio System (MAS) which helped Digital Performer to tap the Macintosh's native power to record music directly to its own hard drive without the need for external co-processing and dedicated drives. By 2000, Digital Performer allowed users to record, mix, and master audio for commercial releases.

== Version history ==
Version 3 of Digital Performer was the last to run on Mac OS 9, the Classic Macintosh operating system. After a complete rewrite, MOTU released Digital Performer 4.0 in May 2003, which ran exclusively on Mac OS X.

Beginning with version 4.5, MOTU introduced a number of important new features to Digital Performer. The two most important of these are built in pitch correction capability, and the professional Masterworks EQ plugin. Beginning with version 5.0, MOTU also introduced a set of virtual instruments. The software was updated to version 5.13 on 19 November 2007 to provide compatibility with Mac OS X v10.5. and available in Universal Binary.

Version 7.2 was introduced in 2010. Digital Performer remains one of the popular audio workstations on the Macintosh. Faster Apple CPUs continue to increase its capacity and performance. Chief among its competition on the Macintosh platform are Pro Tools and Apple's Logic.

In October 2012, MOTU released Digital Performer 8 for OSX. Digital Performer 8 is available on Windows as well.

Version 9 of Digital Performer was released in June 2015 for Mac OS X and Windows. This version contains workflow enhancements, some new effect plugins, including emulations of the 1176 Peak Limiter and Craig Anderton's MultiFuzz. MOTU also included a 64-bit version of its software synth (synthesizer) MX4 which used to be sold as a stand-alone product.

Version 10 of Digital Performer was released in February 2019 for Mac OS X and Windows. This version includes a new 5 GB instruments soundbank, a time/pitch audio stretching feature, and a real time loop triggering function.

== AudioDesk ==
AudioDesk is a more basic version of MOTU's Digital Performer for mac only. It is a multi-track recording, editing, and mixing application, with both offline file-based processing and realtime effects. Much of the graphical user interface (GUI) and its operation are similar to Digital Performer, although it lacks some of Digital Performer's features. Most notably, it does not include MIDI sequencing capabilities, and thus does not include some of Digital Performer's MIDI-specific editing windows. Also, AudioDesk is only available as a bundled application with MOTU audio interfaces; this also means that AudioDesk requires a MOTU audio interface to be used as its soundcard.

AudioDesk version 1 was first released in 1998, as bundled software with the MOTU 2408 PCI-based audio interface. Version 1 is compatible with the Classic Mac OS. Version 2 for Mac OS X was released in 2003, with numerous updates (many of which corresponded to updates from Digital Performer 3 for the Classic Mac OS to Digital Performer 4 for Mac OS X).

== Awards and recognition ==
2001 Electronic Musician Editors Choice Awards

- Best Digital Audio Workstation/Audio Interface

2002 Electronic Musician Editors Choice Awards

- Best Digital Audio Workstation/Audio Interface

2004 Electronic Musician Editors Choice Awards

- Best Digital Audio Workstation/Audio Interface

2010 Electronic Musician Editors Choice Awards

- Best Digital Audio Workstation/Audio Interface

== Notable users ==
Some notable users include:

- Alexandre Desplat
- Steven Bryant
- Hermitude
- John Adams
- Juno Reactor
- Don Davis
- Danny Elfman
- Sparks
- Michael Giacchino
- Scott Gibbons
- Elliot Goldenthal
- Paul Hipp
- Geddy Lee
- Pat Metheny
- Joe Renzetti
- Brad Gillis
- David Bryan
- Yasunori Mitsuda
- Matmos
- Autechre
- They Might Be Giants
- Alan Menken
- Roger O'Donnell
- Kenji Kawai
- Howard Shore
- Bob Sinclar
- Bear McCreary
- Hideki Naganuma
- Wendy Carlos
- Trevor Rabin
- S. Alexander Reed

== See also ==
- Ableton Live
- Cubase
- Nuendo
- Logic Pro
- Pro Tools
- REAPER
- Reason
- Samplitude
- Cakewalk by BandLab
- Acid Pro
- FL Studio
- LMMS

== Bibliography ==
- Ben Newhouse: Producing Music with Digital Performer. Berklee Press u. a., Boston MA u. a. 2004, ISBN 0-87639-056-4
