= List of acquisitions by Sony =

Sony logo

Sony Group Corporation, commonly referred to as Sony (Japanese: ソニー・グループ株式会社, Sonī Gurūpu Kabushiki Kaisha) is a multinational conglomerate corporation headquartered in Minato, Tokyo, Japan, and one of the world's largest media conglomerates. Through its history of acquisitions, Sony has pursued strategic efforts to expand and diversify its business across various fields such as digital media, entertainment and technology. As a result, Sony has broadened its presence in multiple industries, reinforcing its standing in the market.

In 1988, Sony acquired CBS Records Group and CBS's 50% stake in CBS/Sony, marking its first major step into the music industry. Following the acquisition of Columbia Pictures Entertainment in 1989, Sony entered the film and television sectors. The acquisition of Psygnosis in 1993 played a key role in bolstering the launch of Sony's PlayStation video game console in 1994, which saw significant global adoption and signaled the company's shift to digital entertainment.

Established in 2001, Sony Ericsson was a joint venture between Sony Corporation and Ericsson, and in 2012, the acquisition of Ericsson's 50% stake made it the sole shareholder of the mobile phone business. Similarly, Sony BMG was created in 2004 as a joint venture between Sony Music Group and Bertelsmann Music Group, but became fully integrated in 2008 when the company acquired Bertelsmann's stake.

In 2012, Sony Interactive Entertainment acquired Gaikai to enhance its PlayStation Network offerings and extend its reach into the realm of cloud gaming. That same year, Sony Music Group acquired a 30% stake in EMI Music Publishing and purchased the outstanding 70% stake in 2018, making it a wholly owned subsidiary. By acquiring Toshiba's image sensor business in 2015, Sony Semiconductor Solutions strengthened its foothold in imaging solutions.

The acquisition in 2020 of the remaining shares of Sony Financial Group, which were not already held, brought the company entirely under its control. In 2021, Aniplex and Sony Pictures Entertainment completed their acquisition of Crunchyroll, a prominent anime video on demand service. To grow its portfolio in the competitive video game industry, Sony Interactive Entertainment acquired Bungie in 2022.

Sony is known for acquiring over 160 companies, taking stakes in more than 90 others, and making over 20 divestments, although the actual total may be higher, as the company generally does not disclose most of its transactions unless revealed by the press. Furthermore, Sony has not uncovered the financial details of most of its acquisitions, stakes, and divestments.

== Acquisitions ==
Date	Company	Business	Country	Value (USD)	Adjusted (USD)	Used as or integrated with	References
28 February 1975	WEGA	Consumer electronics	DEU	—	—	Sony Corporation	
4 February 1982	Music Center	Professional audio	USA	—	—	Sony Corporation of America	
28 October 1987	Nippon Fairchild Semiconductor chip plant	Semiconductor	JPN	—	—	Sony Semiconductor Solutions	
5 January 1988	CBS Records Group, CBS/Sony	Music	USA	2,000,000,000	5.445×10^{9}	Sony Music Group	
4 January 1989	Tree International Publishing	Music publishing	USA	40,000,000	104,000,000	Sony Music Group	
12 April 1989	Trans Com Systems	In-flight entertainment	USA	—	—	Sony Corporation of America	
19 September 1989	Materials Research	Semiconductor	USA	—	—	Sony Corporation of America	
8 November 1989	Columbia Pictures Entertainment	Film, television	USA	3,400,000,000	8.831×10^{9}	Sony Pictures Entertainment	
9 November 1989	Guber-Peters Entertainment	Film, television	USA	200,000,000	519,000,000	Sony Pictures Entertainment	
22 February 1990	AMD chip plant	Semiconductor	USA	55,000,000	136,000,000	Sony Semiconductor Solutions	
26 June 1991	Culver Studios	Film, television	USA	80,000,000	189,000,000	Sony Pictures Entertainment	
23 August 1991	RCA/Columbia Pictures Home Video	Home entertainment	USA	325,000,000	768,000,000	Sony Pictures Entertainment	
21 May 1993	Psygnosis	Video game	GBR	—	—	Sony Interactive Entertainment	
19 January 1995	Sony of Canada	Consumer electronics	CAN	207,000,000	437,000,000	Sony Canada	
1 March 1996	Sony Life	Insurance	JPN USA	—	—	Sony Financial Group	
15 July 1997	CyberLife Technology game development business	Video game	GBR	—	—	Sony Interactive Entertainment	
30 August 2000	RTime	Broadband networks	USA	—	—	Sony Interactive Entertainment	
1 December 2000	Bend Studio	Video game	USA	—	—	Sony Interactive Entertainment	
22 January 2001	Naughty Dog, Red Zone Interactive	Video game	USA	—	—	Sony Interactive Entertainment	
9 July 2002	Acuff-Rose Music	Music publishing	USA	157,000,000	281,000,000	Sony Music Group	
7 August 2002	Incognito Entertainment	Video game	USA	—	—	Sony Interactive Entertainment	
27 September 2002	Aiwa	Consumer electronics	JPN	—	—	Sony Corporation	
31 July 2003	Sonic Foundry desktop software business	Editing software	USA	19,000,000	33,000,000	Sony Pictures Entertainment	
12 October 2004	GospoCentric Records	Music	USA	—	—	Sony Music Group	
7 January 2005	International Display Technology	Display	JPN	177,000,000	292,000,000	Sony Corporation	
27 September 2005	SN Systems	Game development tool	GBR	—	—	Sony Interactive Entertainment	
7 December 2005	Guerrilla Games	Video game	NLD	—	—	Sony Interactive Entertainment	
19 January 2006	Konica Minolta camera business	Digital camera	JPN	—	—	Sony Corporation	
25 January 2006	Zipper Interactive	Video game	USA	—	—	Sony Interactive Entertainment	
23 August 2006	Crackle	Film, television, video on demand	USA	65,000,000	104,000,000	Sony Pictures Entertainment	
30 May 2007	Famous Music	Music publishing	USA	370,000,000	575,000,000	Sony Music Group	
20 September 2007	Bigbig Studios, Evolution Studios	Video game	GBR	—	—	Sony Interactive Entertainment	
29 February 2008	Sony Bank	Bank	JPN	—	—	Sony Financial Group	
4 June 2008	2waytraffic	Television	NLD	363,000,000	543,000,000	Sony Pictures Entertainment	
2 July 2008	Gracenote	Automatic content recognition	USA	260,000,000	389,000,000	Sony Corporation of America	
1 October 2008	Sony BMG	Music	JPN DEU	1,200,000,000	1.794×10^{9}	Sony Music Group	
5 December 2008	Sony NEC Optiarc	Computer data storage	JPN	—	—	Sony Corporation	
14 January 2009	Embassy Row	Television	USA	—	—	Sony Pictures Entertainment	
28 January 2010	Convergent Media Systems	Content delivery network	USA	—	—	Sony Corporation	
10 February 2010	iCyt Mission Technology	Flow cytometry	USA	—	—	Sony Corporation of America	
2 March 2010	Media Molecule	Video game	GBR	—	—	Sony Interactive Entertainment	
2 February 2011	Suzhou Epson	Display	CHN	118,000,000	169,000,000	Sony China	
28 February 2011	Toshiba chip plant	Image sensor	JPN	648,000,000	927,000,000	Sony Semiconductor Solutions	
7 March 2011	Hawk-Eye Innovations, Pulse Innovations	Computer vision, digital platform	GBR	—	—	Sony Corporation	
2 August 2011	Sucker Punch Productions	Video game	USA	—	—	Sony Interactive Entertainment	
28 September 2011	Micronics	Medical device	USA	—	—	Sony Corporation of America	
24 October 2011	Netblender	Optical disc authoring	USA	—	—	Sony Corporation of America	
16 February 2012	Sony Ericsson	Mobile phone	JPN SWE	1,500,000,000	2.104×10^{9}	Sony Corporation	
12 June 2012	Bulldog United	Automatic content recognition	USA	—	—	Sony Corporation of America	
14 June 2012	Multi Screen Media	Television	IND	271,000,000	380,000,000	Sony Pictures Entertainment	
2 July 2012	Gaikai	Cloud gaming	USA	380,000,000	533,000,000	Sony Interactive Entertainment	
9 August 2012	Sony Network Communications	Internet service provider	JPN	697,000,000	977,000,000	Sony Corporation	
23 August 2012	Left Bank Pictures	Television	USA	—	—	Sony Pictures Entertainment	
12 September 2012	Pixim	Semiconductor	USA	—	—	Sony Corporation	
11 November 2013	Senior Enterprise	Nursing	JPN	—	—	Sony Financial Group	
29 January 2014	Renesas chip plant	Image sensor	JPN	72,000,000	98,000,000	Sony Semiconductor Solutions	
10 February 2014	Stellify Media	Television	GBR	—	—	Sony Pictures Entertainment	
21 February 2014	Teleset	Television	COL	—	—	Sony Pictures Entertainment	
15 August 2014	CSC Media Group	Television	GBR	180,000,000	245,000,000	Sony Pictures Entertainment	
1 December 2014	Curio Pictures	Television	AUS	—	—	Sony Pictures Entertainment	
18 March 2015	The Orchard	Music	USA	200,000,000	272,000,000	Sony Music Group	
24 April 2015	Wakanim	Film, television, video on demand	FRA	—	—	Aniplex	
27 May 2015	Optical Archive	Digital preservation	USA	—	—	Sony Corporation of America	
2 July 2015	Memnon Archiving Services	Digital preservation	BEL	—	—	Sony Europe	
24 August 2015	Century Media Records	Music	DEU	17,000,000	23,000,000	Sony Music Group	
8 October 2015	Softkinetic	Semiconductor	BEL	—	—	Sony Semiconductor Solutions	
6 December 2015	Toshiba image sensor business	Image sensor	JPN	155,000,000	211,000,000	Sony Semiconductor Solutions	
26 January 2016	Altair Semiconductor	Semiconductor	ISR	212,000,000	284,000,000	Sony Semiconductor Solutions	
16 February 2016	Plumbee	Online casino	GBR	—	—	Sony Pictures Entertainment	
2 March 2016	Essential Music & Marketing	Music	GBR	—	—	Sony Music Group	
14 March 2016	Sony/ATV Music Publishing	Music publishing	JPN USA	750,000,000	1.006×10^{9}	Sony Music Group	
2 August 2016	eSaturnus	Professional video over IP	BEL	—	—	Sony Europe	
10 August 2016	Ministry Of Sound Recordings	Music	GBR	104,000,000	140,000,000	Sony Music Group	
31 August 2016	Ten Sports	Television	IND	385,000,000	516,000,000	Sony Pictures Entertainment	
1 February 2017	Wildstar Records	Music	GBR	2,250,000	3,000,000	Sony Music Group	
16 February 2017	TruTV	Television	GBR	—	—	Sony Pictures Entertainment	
23 April 2017	Crispin	Broadcast automation	USA	—	—	Sony Corporation	
4 May 2017	finetunes, Phonofile	Music	DEU NOR	—	—	Sony Music Group	
10 July 2017	Yuuai Holdings	Nursing	JPN	—	—	Sony Financial Group	
31 July 2017	Funimation	Film, television, video on demand	USA	143,000,000	188,000,000	Sony Pictures Entertainment	
4 September 2017	Revolve	Action figure	JPN	—	—	Aniplex	
22 May 2018	EMI Music Publishing	Music publishing	GBR	2,300,000,000	2.949×10^{9}	Sony Music Group	
26 June 2018	Raymond Gubbay	Event promotion	GBR	—	—	Sony Music Group	
8 January 2019	Audiokinetic	Game development tool	CAN	—	—	Sony Interactive Entertainment	
6 February 2019	Madman Anime Group	Film, television, video on demand	AUS	25,000,000	31,000,000	Aniplex	
29 May 2019	Manga Entertainment	Film, television	GBR	—	—	Sony Pictures Entertainment	
10 June 2019	Mido Holdings	Network virtualization	CHE	—	—	Sony Semiconductor Solutions	
8 July 2019	Nurulize	On-set virtual production	USA	—	—	Sony Pictures Entertainment	
31 July 2019	Milan Records	Music	USA	—	—	Sony Music Group	
6 August 2019	The Araca Group merchandising business	Merchandising	USA	—	—	Sony Music Group	
19 August 2019	Insomniac Games	Video game	USA	229,000,000	288,000,000	Sony Interactive Entertainment	
5 September 2019	Kontraband	Merchandising	GBR	—	—	Sony Music Group	
18 November 2019	Game Show Network	Television	USA	500,000,000	630,000,000	Sony Pictures Entertainment	
10 December 2019	Silvergate Media	Television	USA	195,000,000	246,000,000	Sony Pictures Entertainment	
30 January 2020	Insightness	Dynamic vision sensor	CHE	—	—	Sony Semiconductor Solutions	
1 July 2020	Eleven	Television	GBR	—	—	Sony Pictures Entertainment	
2 September 2020	Sony Financial Holdings	Financial services	JPN	3,700,000,000	4.603×10^{9}	Sony Financial Group	
1 October 2020	Nevion	On-set virtual production	NOR	—	—	Sony Corporation	
12 November 2020	Pure Flix	Film, television, video on demand	USA	—	—	Sony Pictures Entertainment	
4 December 2020	Human Re-Sources	Music	USA	—	—	Sony Music Group	
8 December 2020	Probity	Merchandising	GBR	—	—	Sony Music Group	
11 June 2021	Floresta	Television	BRA	—	—	Sony Pictures Entertainment	
16 June 2021	Somethin' Else	Podcast, radio program	GBR	—	—	Sony Music Group	
23 June 2021	Alamo Records	Music	USA	—	—	Sony Music Group	
29 June 2021	Housemarque	Video game	FIN	—	—	Sony Interactive Entertainment	
1 July 2021	Nixxes Software	Video game	NLD	—	—	Sony Interactive Entertainment	
9 August 2021	Crunchyroll	Film, television, video on demand	USA	1,175,000,000	1.396×10^{9}	Aniplex, Sony Pictures Entertainment	
8 September 2021	Firesprite	Video game	GBR	—	—	Sony Interactive Entertainment	
29 September 2021	Fabrik Games	Video game	GBR	—	—	Sony Interactive Entertainment	
30 September 2021	Bluepoint Games	Video game	USA	—	—	Sony Interactive Entertainment	
1 December 2021	Bad Wolf	Television	GBR	—	—	Sony Pictures Entertainment	
10 December 2021	Valkyrie Entertainment	Video game	USA	—	—	Sony Interactive Entertainment	
19 January 2022	Ceremony of Roses	Merchandising	USA	—	—	Sony Music Group	
20 January 2022	Ultra Records	Music	USA	—	—	Sony Music Group	
1 February 2022	Lasengle	Video game	JPN	—	—	Aniplex	
3 March 2022	Industrial Media	Television	USA	350,000,000	385,000,000	Sony Pictures Entertainment	
4 March 2022	Som Livre	Music	BRA	255,000,000	281,000,000	Sony Music Group	
16 March 2022	AWAL, Kobalt Neighboring Rights	Music	USA	430,000,000	473,000,000	Sony Music Group	
11 July 2022	Haven Studios	Video game	CAN	—	—	Sony Interactive Entertainment	
15 July 2022	Bungie	Video game	USA	3,700,000,000	4.071×10^{9}	Sony Interactive Entertainment	
18 July 2022	Repeat.gg	Esports	USA	—	—	Sony Interactive Entertainment	
4 August 2022	Right Stuf	E-commerce, film, television	USA	—	—	Aniplex, Sony Pictures Entertainment	
29 August 2022	Neon Koi	Video game	DEU FIN	—	—	Sony Interactive Entertainment	
25 November 2022	Pixomondo	Visual effects	USA	—	—	Sony Pictures Entertainment	
7 November 2022	Beyond Sports	Software visualization	NLD	—	—	Sony Corporation	
9 March 2023	Above Board	Music	GBR	—	—	Sony Music Group	
20 April 2023	Firewalk Studios	Video game	USA	—	—	Sony Interactive Entertainment	
31 May 2023	Myriagon Studio	Film, television	JPN	—	—	Aniplex	
26 June 2023	OKListen	Music	IND	—	—	Sony Music Group	
24 August 2023	Audeze	Audio electronics	USA	—	—	Sony Interactive Entertainment	
2 November 2023	iSIZE	Video processing	GBR	—	—	Sony Interactive Entertainment	
16 January 2024	Altafonte Network	Music	ESP	—	—	Sony Music Group	
1 April 2024	Japan Display panel plant	Display	JPN	11,460,000	12,000,000	Sony Semiconductor Solutions	
8 April 2024	Neon Hum Media	Podcast	USA	—	—	Sony Music Group	
12 June 2024	Alamo Drafthouse Cinema	Movie theater	USA	200,000,000	205,000,000	Sony Pictures Entertainment	
17 June 2024	3Hz	Animation	JPN	—	—	Aniplex	
1 July 2024	Eleventh Hour Films	Television	GBR	—	—	Sony Pictures Entertainment	
11 September 2024	Zepp	Music venue	JPN	—	—	Sony Music Group	
16 October 2024	KinaTrax	Motion capture	USA	—	—	Sony Corporation	
19 November 2024	Wati B	Music	FRA	11,000,000	11,000,000	Sony Music Group	
22 November 2024	Just In Case	Insurance	JPN	—	—	Sony Financial Group	
4 December 2024	Cobalt Music	Music	GRC	—	—	Sony Music Group	
14 January 2025	Supraphon	Music	CZE	—	—	Sony Music Group	
10 March 2025	A.W.A.	Music	FRA	—	—	Sony Music Group	
8 April 2025	Tokyo Art Beat	Media platform	JPN	—	—	Sony Music Group	
8 June 2025	Hipgnosis Songs Group	Music publishing	USA	70,000,000	70,000,000	Sony Music Group	
2 July 2025	Africa Nostra, Lusafrica	Music, music publishing	FRA	—	—	Sony Music Group	
8 October 2025	STATSports Group	Wearable technology	GBR	—	—	Sony Corporation	
13 January 2026	Big Yellow Dog Music	Music publishing	USA	—	—	Sony Music Group	
14 January 2026	F.A.M.E. Recordings	Music	DEU	—	—	Sony Music Group	
2 February 2026	Egg Firm	Animation	JPN	—	—	Aniplex	
19 February 2026	Spookland	Music, music publishing	FRA	—	—	Sony Music Group	
24 March 2026	One Seven Music	Music	DNK	—	—	Sony Music Group	
2 April 2026	Cinemersive Labs	Computer vision, machine learning	GBR	—	—	Sony Interactive Entertainment	
3 April 2026	Lay-duce	Animation	JPN	—	—	Aniplex, Sony Pictures Entertainment	
1 May 2026	Onimusic	Music	BRA	—	—	Sony Music Group	
18 May 2026	32 Flavors	Television	USA	—	—	Sony Pictures Entertainment	
23 July 2026	Monty Norman	Music publishing	GBR	—	—	Sony Music Group	

== Stakes ==
Date	Company	Stake	Business	Country	Value (USD)	Adjusted (USD)	References
1 March 1968	CBS/Sony	50%, currently 100%	Music	JPN USA	—	—	
1 August 1979	Sony Prudential Life	50%, currently 16.4%	Insurance	JPN USA	—	—	
8 November 1989	Castle Rock Entertainment	44%, currently 0%	Film, television	USA	—	—	
8 November 1989	RCA/Columbia Pictures Home Video	50%, currently 100%	Home entertainment	USA	—	—	
18 September 1995	Multi Screen Media	62%, currently 100%	Television	IND	—	—	
27 November 1995	Sony/ATV Music Publishing	50%, currently 100%	Music publishing	JPN USA	115,000,000	243,000,000	
27 October 1997	ST Liquid Crystal Display	50%, currently 10%	Display	JPN	—	—	
25 November 1997	Telemundo	37.48%, currently 0%	Television	USA	125,000,000	251,000,000	
1 December 1998	General Instrument	4.3%	Semiconductor	USA	187,500,000	370,000,000	
30 July 1999	ePlus	50%, currently 51%	Primary ticket outlet	JPN	—	—	
29 September 2000	M3	90%, currently 34%	Medical websites	JPN	—	—	
11 June 2001	Sony Bank	80%, currently 16.4%	Bank	JPN	248,000,000	451,000,000	
1 October 2001	Sony Ericsson	50%, currently 100%	Mobile phone	JPN SWE	250,000,000	455,000,000	
8 October 2001	Square	19%, currently 0%	Video game	JPN	124,000,000	225,000,000	
13 November 2002	Intertrust Technologies	49%	Digital rights management	USA	226,500,000	405,000,000	
26 April 2004	S-LCD	49%, currently 0%	Display	JPN KOR	1,000,000,000	1.705×10^{9}	
6 August 2004	Sony BMG	50%, currently 100%	Music	JPN DEU	—	—	
28 November 2004	Huaso	49%	Film, television	CHN	—	—	
8 April 2005	MGM Holdings	20%, currently 0%	Film, television	USA	257,000,000	424,000,000	
16 June 2005	Shine Group	21%, currently 0%	Television	GBR	—	—	
1 September 2005	Madhouse	minority	Animation	JPN	—	—	
1 December 2005	Sony Network Communications	58%, currently 100%	Internet service provider	JPN	—	—	
3 April 2006	Sony NEC Optiarc	55%, currently 0%	Computer data storage	JPN	—	—	
6 March 2007	Cellius	49%	Video game	JPN	—	—	
2 April 2007	Field Emission Technologies	36.5%	Field-emission display	JPN	—	—	
11 October 2007	Sony Financial Holdings	60%, currently 16.4%	Financial services	JPN	—	—	
14 November 2007	Moversa	50%	Contactless smart card	JPN NLD	14,000,000	22,000,000	
13 December 2007	Tuvalu Media	60%, currently 0%	Television	NLD	—	—	
27 March 2008	Gogglebox	minority	Television	GBR	—	—	
7 October 2008	Spotify	6%, currently 2.85%	Music streaming service	SWE	2,200,000	3,000,000	
1 July 2009	Sharp Display Products	7.04%, currently 0%	Display	JPN	109,000,000	164,000,000	
8 December 2009	Fearnet	33.3%, currently 0%	Film, television, video on demand	USA	—	—	
8 December 2009	Vevo	majority	Music	USA	—	—	
19 January 2010	Syco Entertainment	50%, currently 0%	Music	GBR	—	—	
23 June 2011	Victory Television	50%	Television	GBR	—	—	
1 March 2012	Silver River Productions	majority	Television	GBR	—	—	
29 June 2012	EMI Music Publishing	30%, currently 100%	Music publishing	GBR	607,500,000	852,000,000	
28 September 2012	Olympus	11.46%, currently 0%	Optical devices	JPN	600,000,000	841,000,000	
8 November 2012	Game Show Network	58%, currently 100%	Television	USA	234,000,000	328,000,000	
16 April 2013	Sony Olympus Medical Solutions	51%	Medical device	JPN	—	—	
12 August 2013	Bleeding Fingers Music	50%	Film score, soundtrack	USA	—	—	
22 August 2013	Scarlet Media	majority	Television	GBR	—	—	
8 July 2015	Internet Media Services	51%, currently minority	Digital marketing	USA	100,000,000	136,000,000	
16 March 2016	Fable Pictures	minority	Television	GBR	—	—	
7 April 2016	Planet TV	majority	Television	TUR	—	—	
18 May 2016	Cogitai	majority	Artificial intelligence	USA	—	—	
7 June 2016	Blueprint Television	minority	Television	GBR	—	—	
19 July 2016	Palladium Fiction	minority	Television	SWE	—	—	
1 September 2016	DefinedCrowd	minority	Artificial intelligence	USA	—	—	
20 September 2017	Stolen Picture	minority	Television	GBR	—	—	
28 March 2018	Live2D	majority	Computer animation, motion graphics	JPN	—	—	
14 May 2018	Peanuts Holdings	39%, currently 80%	Comic, film, television	USA	642,000,000	823,000,000	
22 May 2018	APM Music	50%	Production music	USA	—	—	
28 January 2019	Cinnamon AI	minority	Artificial intelligence	JPN	—	—	
6 August 2019	Senbla	majority	Event promotion	GBR	—	—	
18 February 2020	The Whisper Group	30%, currently 0%	Television	GBR	—	—	
9 April 2020	Bilibili	4.98%	Film, television, video on demand	CHN	400,000,000	498,000,000	
14 April 2020	BeatStars	minority	Music licensing	USA	—	—	
28 April 2020	iDreamSky	minority	Video game	CHN	5,000,000	6,000,000	
8 July 2020	Satisfaction Group	20%	Television	FRA	—	—	
9 July 2020	Epic Games	1.4%, currently 5.4%	Software development, video game	USA	1,450,000,000	1.804×10^{9}	
22 September 2020	Ximalaya	minority	Music streaming service	CHN	50,000,000	62,000,000	
4 February 2021	Kadokawa	1.93%, currently 10.11%	Film, publishing, television	JPN	365,000,000	434,000,000	
18 March 2021	Evolution Championship Series	50%, currently 0%	Esports	USA	—	—	
3 May 2021	Discord	minority	Instant messaging, voice over IP	USA	—	—	
10 August 2021	Tiger Media International	minority	Music	DEU	—	—	
18 October 2021	Scopely	minority	Video game	USA	500,000,000	594,000,000	
4 November 2021	Devolver Digital	5.03%	Video game	USA	—	—	
9 November 2021	Japan Advanced Semiconductor Manufacturing	20%, currently 6%	Semiconductor	JPN	500,000,000	594,000,000	
23 November 2021	NetEase Cloud Music	minority	Music streaming service	CHN	100,000,000	119,000,000	
14 March 2022	WK Records	minority	Music	USA	—	—	
3 May 2022	AccelByte	minority	Backend as a service	USA	—	—	
16 June 2022	Sony Honda Mobility	50%	Battery electric vehicle	JPN	—	—	
31 August 2022	FromSoftware	14.09%	Video game	JPN	122,000,000	134,000,000	
3 November 2022	MAC Global	majority	Event promotion	ARE	—	—	
11 November 2022	Rapidus	minority	Semiconductor	JPN	7,500,000	8,000,000	
12 April 2023	Raspberry Pi Holdings	minority	Semiconductor	GBR	—	—	
24 April 2023	Rimas Entertainment	30%	Music	PRI	—	—	
26 April 2023	Neural Pocket	4.56%	Artificial intelligence	JPN	5,000,000	5,000,000	
18 May 2023	Proactiv Entertainment	majority	Event promotion	ESP	—	—	
12 September 2023	Sony Network Communications Labs	90%	Blockchain, web3	JPN SGP	—	—	
20 December 2023	Akatsuki	9.87%	Video game	JPN	—	—	
23 January 2024	OVO Sound	minority	Music	CAN	—	—	
29 January 2024	Carry1st	minority	Video game	ZAF	—	—	
13 August 2024	Black Sky Creative	majority	Music	USA	—	—	
18 May 2025	Gaudiy	minority	Blockchain	JPN	48,700,000	49,000,000	
24 July 2025	Bandai Namco Holdings	2.5%	Animation, music, video game	JPN	464,000,000	464,000,000	
30 October 2025	Elements Music	minority	Music publishing	FIN	—	—	
16 December 2025	SYE Holdings	49%	Music	VNM	—	—	
24 June 2026	Cosm	minority	Interactive media, extended reality	USA	100,000,000	100,000,000	
28 August 2026	GungHo Online Entertainment	23.29%	Video game	JPN	178,700,000	179,000,000	

== Divestitures ==
Date	Acquirer	Target company	Target business	Acquirer country	Value (USD)	Adjusted (USD)	References
8 December 1999	Praxair	Materials Research	Sony Corporation of America	USA	—	—	
1 June 2000	Rockwell Collins	Trans Com Systems	Sony Corporation of America	USA	—	—	
6 August 2002	Oaktree Capital Management, Onex	Loews Cineplex Entertainment	Sony Pictures Entertainment	USA CAN	—	—	
6 April 2004	Studio City Los Angeles	Culver Studios	Sony Pictures Entertainment	USA	125,000,000	213,000,000	
20 February 2008	Toshiba	Cell chip plant	Sony Interactive Entertainment	JPN	835,000,000	1.249×10^{9}	
1 March 2011	J. Front Retailing	StylingLife Holdings	Sony Corporation	JPN	—	—	
28 June 2012	Development Bank of Japan	Sony Chemicals	Sony Corporation	JPN	730,000,000	1.024×10^{9}	
21 December 2012	BMG Rights Management	Famous Music UK music catalogue	Sony Music Group	DEU	90,000,000	126,000,000	
2 July 2013	Anthem Records	Music catalogue 1993–2012	Sony Pictures Entertainment	CAN	150,000,000	207,000,000	
23 December 2013	Tribune Media	Gracenote	Sony Corporation of America	USA	170,000,000	235,000,000	
6 February 2014	Japan Industrial Partners	Sony Vaio	Sony Corporation	JPN	—	—	
2 February 2015	Columbus Nova	Sony Online Entertainment	Sony Interactive Entertainment	USA	—	—	
24 May 2016	Magix	Sonic Foundry desktop software business	Sony Pictures Entertainment	USA	—	—	
28 July 2016	Murata Manufacturing	Lithium-ion battery business	Sony Corporation	JPN	168,000,000	225,000,000	
7 June 2017	Reservoir Media	Century Media Records music catalogue	Sony Music Group	USA	—	—	
19 June 2017	VinPower Digital	Sony NEC Optiarc	Sony Corporation	USA	—	—	
28 March 2019	Chicken Soup for the Soul Entertainment	Crackle	Sony Pictures Entertainment	USA	—	—	
8 July 2020	Satisfaction Group	Sony Pictures Television France	Sony Pictures Entertainment	FRA	—	—	
21 April 2021	ES Broadcast	Memnon Archiving Services	Sony Europe	GBR	—	—	
18 October 2021	Scopely	GSN Games	Sony Pictures Entertainment	USA	1,000,000,000	1.188×10^{9}	
27 July 2022	Banijay	Sony Pictures Television Germany	Sony Pictures Entertainment	FRA	—	—	
27 July 2022	Média Participations	Anime Digital Network	Aniplex, Sony Pictures Entertainment	FRA	—	—	
22 December 2023	Blackstone	Sony Payment Services	Sony Financial Group	USA	280,000,000	296,000,000	
16 July 2025	HarperCollins	Crunchyroll Manga France and Germany	Aniplex, Sony Pictures Entertainment	GBR USA	—	—	

== See also ==
- List of largest mergers and acquisitions
- Lists of corporate acquisitions and mergers
