= Vegas Movie Studio =

Video editing software

VEGAS Movie Studio
- Vegas Movie Studio Platinum 12
- Original author: Sonic Foundry
- Developer: VEGAS Creative Software
- Stable release: 17.0 / 7 May 2020; 5 years ago
- Preview release: 9 July 2003; 22 years ago / 15 December 2002; 22 years ago
- Operating system: Windows 7 or later
- Website: vegascreativesoftware.com

VEGAS Movie Studio (previously Sony Vegas Movie Studio) was a consumer-based nonlinear video editor designed for the PC. It was a scaled-down version of Vegas Pro. It was developed by Sony for its first 13 versions. It was sold in Sony's larger 2016 sale of much of its creative software suite to Magix, who developed Versions 14 to 17. Magix would later discontinue VEGAS Movie Studio in 2021, in favor of the unrelated Magix Movie Studio.

VEGAS Movie Studio was formerly known as "Sonic Foundry VideoFactory" and "Sony Screenblast Movie Studio".

== Features ==
=== Video features ===
Unlike its professional counterpart, Movie Studio can only edit with ten video tracks and ten audio tracks (originally it was set with two video tracks, a title overlay track and three audio tracks). The Platinum Edition of Sony Movie Studio, furthermore, can edit with 20 video and 20 audio tracks. It can edit in multiple as well as standard 4:3 and 16:9 aspect ratios, and it's one of the very few consumer editors that can also edit 24p video (after a manual frame rate setup). It also does not have the same advanced compositing tools as Vegas does, and does not have project nesting or masking.

The Platinum Edition of Movie Studio has powerful color correction tools similar to the version on Vegas Pro, including a three-wheel color corrector. It also adds HDV and AVCHD-editing capabilities, but does not support SD or HD-SDI formats.

Like Vegas Pro, the Movie Studio versions can also perform DV batch capture, a feature usually found only in high-end video editors. Version 6 also added the ability to capture from Sony Handycam DVD camcorders. However, it cannot capture analog video without the use of a FireWire video converter.

Movie Studio features significantly more effects and transitions than the full version of Vegas does. However, if the user upgrades to the full version of Vegas, then the user still gets to keep those same effects.

Movie Studio supports a wide variety of file formats and codecs and can use "Video for Windows" codecs to support even more.

=== Audio features ===
Movie Studio has 13 different audio effects, and the Platinum version adds more, in addition to 5.1 surround sound mixing and editing. The software is also compatible with Sony's ACID Music Studio software, and an even more cut-down version called ACID Xpress ships with the 1001 Sound Effects CD included.

=== Other features ===
With version 7, Vegas Movie Studio Platinum Edition added the ability to export to iPod and Sony PSP, a feature that was originally only available in the full version of Vegas and is becoming increasingly common in consumer-level video editors. Both versions also ship with a cut-down version of Sony's DVD Architect software, called DVD Architect Studio, replacing the Sonic MyDVD program bundled with the software when it was titled as Screenblast Movie Studio.

Sony added "Show Me How" tutorials for users new to the software or digital video editing. Both versions also ship with Sony's 1001 Sound Effects CD (in contrast to Vegas's Limited Edition Sony Pictures Sound Effects CD), which also includes ACID XPress, an even more scaled-down version of their ACID music creation software. Similarly, the product also ships with sample video clips and music loops to enhance the users' home video projects.

Version 9 also added direct upload to YouTube, an increasingly common feature in many consumer-oriented editing programs.

Version 10 added GPU rendering, and allowed movie studio users to benefit from Sony Vegas Pro 9's improved audio stretching and pitch shifting capabilities. It also allowed for a maximum of 20 Tracks (10 video, 10 audio).

In Version 12 and 13, the track limit was doubled to 20 video and 20 audio tracks. Version 13 also allows for editing and rendering projects in 4K video. Version 13 dropped "Vegas" from the name of the program, reserving it exclusively for the professional edition.

Version 14 was the first version after the acquisition. It dramatically increased the maximum track limit to 200 video and 200 audio tracks. Each version since has had this limit. Also in this version, Magix restored "VEGAS" in the name.
