= Adrian von Ziegler =

Swiss composer from Zurich (born 1989)

- Born: Adrian von Ziegler; 25 December 1989 (age 36); Zurich, Switzerland
- Genres: Celtic; Norse; dark alternative; world; symphonic metal; folk metal; film score; electronic music; pirate music
- Occupations: Songwriter; music producer; multi-instrumentalist; writer
- Instruments: Piano; keyboard; bagpipes; guitar; bass; percussion
- Years active: 2005–present
- Website: adrianvonziegler.bandcamp.com

Adrian von Ziegler (German: [ˈaːdʁiaːn fɔn ˈtsiːɡlɐ]; born 25 December 1989) is a Swiss composer from Zurich, Switzerland. He gained popularity on the video-sharing website YouTube, where his channel has over 1,000,000 subscribers as of May 2021. He composes instrumental music with a variety of Celtic Music, Emotional Music, Relaxing Music, Dark Music, Oriental Music, Fantasy Music, Movie Scores, Metal and many other genres. Adrian von Ziegler started using a "very old keyboard" and Magix Music Maker to compose his music. He still has this keyboard, but now mainly uses Cubase. Although there are few signs of media attention, von Ziegler was featured in a Magix magazine article in 2012.

== Musical career ==
At age 15, von Ziegler began his musical experience as a drummer in a local rock band. However, wanting more melodic expression, he quit the band and started to compose music independently, using only a headset microphone and guitar.

From 2007 to 2009, he recorded countless demo songs under the artist name "Indigo", in which his guitar would get replaced increasingly often by keyboard and orchestral arrangements of which he grew to favor. In 2008, he began releasing music on the social networking site Myspace.

After dropping the Indigo pseudonym in 2009, he began releasing music under his own name, starting with the albums Requiem and Lifeclock in 2010.

== Style and inspiration ==
Much of von Ziegler's music is characterized by traditional and orchestral instrumentation, digitally composed and synthesized. He states that his inspiration originates from a variety of sources, including Celtic and Norse mythology, movie and video game soundtracks and fantasy literature. He attributes his orchestral style to the influence of composers such as Hans Zimmer, Koji Kondo and Jeremy Soule.

He also notes that his emotions, natural surroundings, imaginary worlds and wife all give him inspiration for his musical works.

== Other achievements ==
In 2021, von Ziegler released a 400-page dictionary describing Inra, a constructed language he developed over 10 years and which often features in his music. As of its release, the publication contained:

- Dictionary of over 20,000 words and terms (276 pages)
- Grammar section and conjugation charts (81 pages)
- Name section, with over 1,000 Inra personal names and their meanings (25 pages)
- Proverb section (currently in the beginning stage)
- Etymology section (currently in the beginning stage)

== Discography ==
Year	Album
2010	Requiem
2010	Lifeclock
2011	Across Acheron
2011	Wanderer
2011	Mirror of the Night
2012	Mortualia
2012	Spellbound
2012	Starchaser
2012	The Celtic Collection (Compilation)
2012	Odyssey
2013	Feather and Skull
2013	Vagabond
2014	Libertas
2014	The Celtic Collection II (Compilation)
2014	Queen of Thorns
2016	Atmospheres
2016	Moonsong
2017	Celtic Guitar: Dance with the Strings (with Łukasz Kapuściński)
2018	Saga
2019	Fable
2019	The Celtic Collection III (Compilation)
2020	Veiled
2020	Moondance
2020	Darkness Eternal
2020	Traveler
2020	Dreams of Summer (Single)
2021	For The Pack
2021	The Celtic Collection IV (Compilation)
2022	Equinox
2022	Odyssey II
2023	Loneliness (Remix) (Single)
2024	Of the Old World (Compilation)
2025	The Celtic Collection V (Compilation)

== Sources ==
- "YouTube – Adrian von Ziegler – First Interview (Part 2/2)". youtube.com.
- "Adrian von Ziegler - TheCelticCrier.com". thecelticcrier.com. Archived from the original on 19 October 2013.
- Adrian von Ziegler. Spotify.com. Retrieved 9 May 2025.
