= Boris FX =

Software development company

- Type: Private
- Industry: Video effects software
- Founded: 1995; 31 years ago
- Founder: Boris Yamnitsky
- Headquarters: Miami, Florida, USA
- Area served: Worldwide
- Products: Continuum; CrumplePop; Mocha Pro; Optics; Particle Illusion; Sapphire; Silhouette; SynthEyes; Vegas Pro; Sound Forge; Acid Pro; Samplitude
- Owner: Boris Yamnitsky
- Website: borisfx.com

Boris FX is a visual effects, video editing, photography, and audio software plug-in developer based in Miami, Florida, USA. The developer is known for its flagship products, Continuum (formerly Boris Continuum Complete/BCC), Sapphire, Mocha, and Silhouette.

Boris FX creates plug-in tools for feature film, broadcast television, and multimedia post-production workflows. The plug-ins are compatible with various NLEs, including Adobe After Effects and Premiere Pro, Avid Media Composer, Apple Final Cut Pro, and OFX hosts such as Autodesk Flame, Foundry Nuke, Blackmagic Design DaVinci Resolve and Fusion, and Vegas Pro.

Boris FX has incorporated artificial intelligence into its software, introducing features for noise reduction, rotoscoping, upscaling, and masking. The company has acquired technologies via mergers and acquisitions from Imagineer Systems, GenArts, Silhouette FX, Digital Film Tools, CrumplePop and Andersson Technologies to expand its visual effects, editing, photography, and audio tools.

== History ==
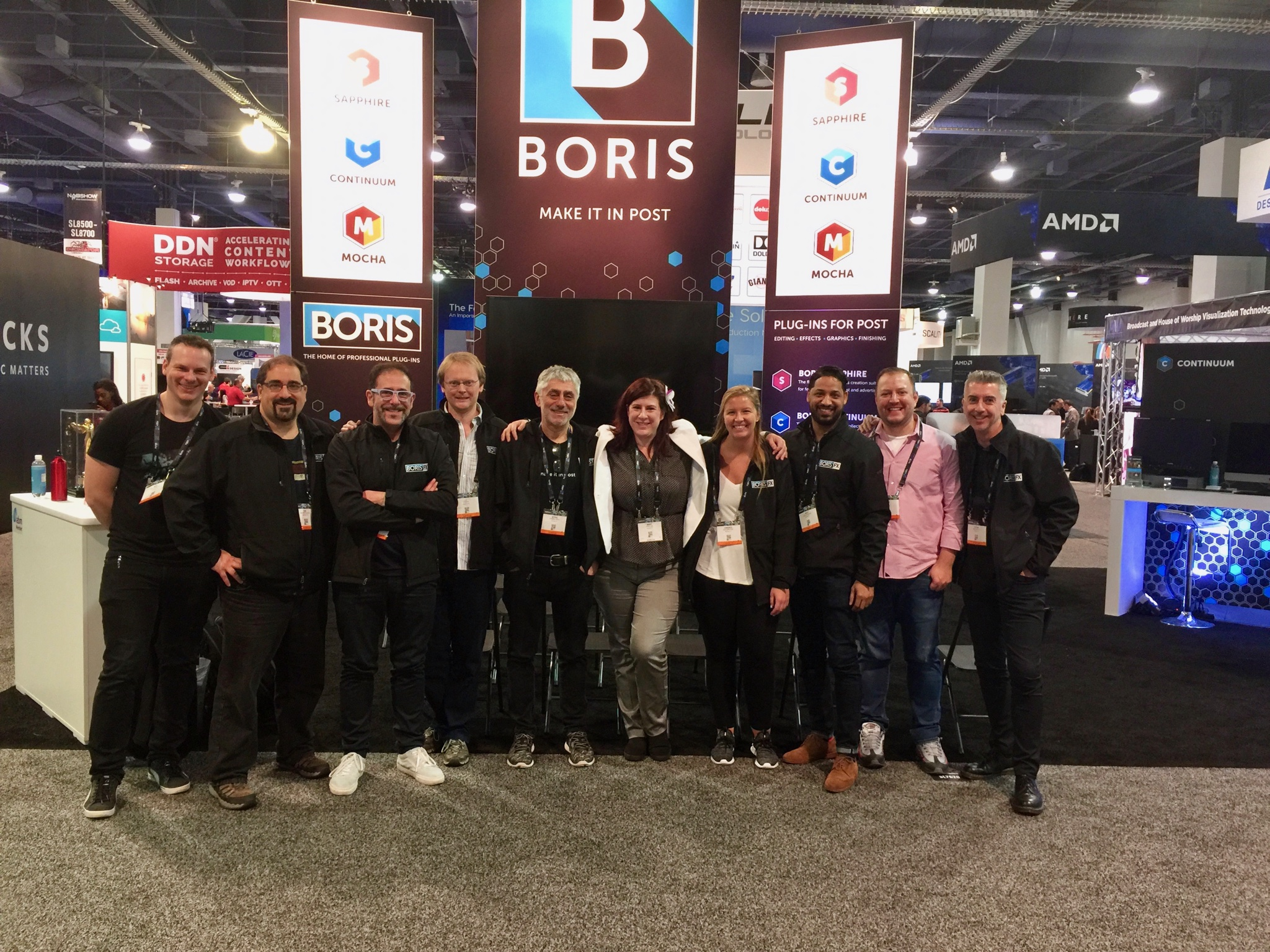
Team photo in front of the Boris FX booth at NAB 2018 in Las Vegas, Nevada

Boris FX was founded in 1995 by Boris Yamnitsky. The former Media 100 engineer (a member of the original Media 100 launch team in 1993) released “Boris FX,” the first plug-in-based digital video effects (DVE) for Adobe Premiere and Media 100, in 1995. The plug-in won Best of Show at Apple Macworld in Boston, MA that same year.

The Boris FX Suite includes a range of visual effects and post-production tools, such as Sapphire, Continuum, Mocha Pro, Silhouette, SynthEyes, CrumplePop, Optics, and Particle Illusion.

== Media 100 ==
In October 2005, Yamnitsky acquired Media 100 the company that launched his plug-in career. Boris FX had a long relationship with Media 100 which bundled Boris RED software as its main titling and compositing solution. Media 100's video editing software is available as freeware for macOS.

== Continuum ==
Continuum is a visual effect and compositing plugin suite that includes a library of over 300 effects and more than 40 transitions, including tools for image restoration, compositing, titling, particle generation, and stylized effects, along with features such as lens flares, lighting effects, and cinematic color grading presets.

A key component of Continuum is its integration with the Mocha planar tracking and masking system, enabling advanced tracking and rotoscoping within the effects. The suite also includes Particle Illusion, a real-time particle generator used for creating visual effects such as explosions, smoke, and abstract motion graphics, as well as Primatte Studio, a chroma keying and compositing toolset for green screen and blue screen workflows.

Continuum supports GPU acceleration and offers compatibility with HDR and 360/VR content. Regular updates introduce new effects, presets, and performance enhancements to expand its capabilities.

In October 2018, Continuum relaunched Particle Illusion, a Mocha Essentials workflow with magnetic edge-snapping, and updates to Title Studio. In October 2019, Continuum introduced Corner Pin Studio with built-in Mocha tracking for quick screen replacement and inserts, 6 stylized transitions, and 4 creative effects.

In October 2020, Continuum released an update that included over 80 GPU-accelerated effects such as film stocks, color grades, optical filter simulations, and a digital gobo library. The update also introduced a custom FX Editor interface, real-time particles, and more than 1,000 drag-and-drop presets. In November 2021, it added multi-frame rendering for After Effects, native Apple M1 support, fluid dynamics in Particle Illusion, and 60 color-grade presets. In October 2022, the software introduced 10 additional transitions, a revised Particle Illusion workflow, an atmospheric glow effect, and more than 250 curated presets.

Continuum plugins have been used in television, streaming, and film projects, including A Black Lady Sketch Show (HBO/HBO Max), Star Trek: Discovery (CBS), Andor (Disney+), The Curse of Oak Island (History Channel), Keeping up with the Kardashians (E!), This Old House (PBS), Ms. Marvel (Disney+), MasterChef (Fox), WipeOut (TBS), The Boys (Prime Video), and The Today Show (NBC).

== Mocha Pro ==
In December 2014, Boris FX merged with Imagineer Systems, the UK-based developer of the Academy Award-winning planar motion tracking software, Mocha Pro. Mocha Pro's features include planar tracking (motion tracking), rotoscoping, image stabilization, 3D camera tracking, and object removal. In June 2016, Mocha released (v5) which introduced Mocha Pro's tools as plug-ins for Adobe After Effects and Premiere Pro, Avid Media Composer, and OFX hosts Foundry's NUKE, Blackmagic Design Fusion, VEGAS Pro, and HitFilm.

A simplified version, Mocha AE, is included with Adobe After Effects Creative Cloud and has been bundled with the software since CS4. A similar version is also available with HitFilm Pro from FXhome and VEGAS Pro. Mocha's tracking SDK is integrated into other visual effects tools, including SAM Quantel Pablo Rio, Silhouette FX, CoreMelt, and Motion VFX.

Mocha Pro has been used in various film and television productions, including Birdman, Black Swan, the Harry Potter series, The Hobbit, Star Wars, The Mandalorian, Star Trek: Discovery, and The Umbrella Academy. It has also been employed in projects such as Gone Girl, The Hunger Games: Mockingjay – Part 1, Game of Thrones, and House of Cards.

== Sapphire ==
GenArts, founded by Karl Sims in 1996, developed visual effects plug-ins that were used by studios and post-production facilities. In September 2016, Boris FX merged with former competitor, GenArts, Inc., developer of Sapphire high-end visual effects plug-ins, to expand its suite of motion graphics and VFX tools. The merger brought Sapphire alongside Boris Continuum Complete (BCC) and Mocha Pro, integrating these tools for film and television post-production.

The Sapphire suite includes a library of over 270 effects and transitions, organized into categories such as lighting, stylization, distortions, textures, and transitions. Commonly used effects include glows, lens flares, film looks, and blurs. The plug-ins are designed to be GPU-accelerated, allowing for improved rendering performance and real-time previews in supported host applications.

A central feature of Sapphire is the Builder tool, a node-based workspace that allows users to create custom effects and transitions by combining multiple Sapphire plug-ins. This enables a high level of creative flexibility and reusability, making it a popular tool for both editors and VFX artists.

Sapphire also integrates with Mocha, Boris FX's planar tracking and masking system, allowing for advanced control of visual elements within an effect.

In October 2017, Boris FX released its first new version of Sapphire since the GenArts acquisition. Sapphire (v11) now includes integrated Mocha tracking and masking tools. Sapphire is available for Adobe, Avid, the Autodesk Flame family, and OFX hosts including Blackmagic DaVinci Resolve and Fusion, and Foundry's NUKE. As part of the merger, Boris FX acquired the rights to Particle Illusion. In 2018, Boris FX reintroduced the product to the larger NLE/Compositing market.

Sapphire's plug-ins transitioned from C to C++ to improve performance and support higher-resolution visual effects. This update enhanced floating-point calculations, compatibility with film editing APIs, and integration with NVIDIA's CUDA for faster rendering. The plug-ins have been used in various films, including Avatar, the Harry Potter and the Prisoner of Azkaban, Iron Man, The Lord of the Rings, The Matrix trilogy, Titanic, and X-Men.

== Particle Illusion ==
As part of the merger with GenArts in 2016, Boris FX acquired the rights to the Particle Illusion (formerly particleIllusion) product, a storied particle system from the original developer Alan Lorence, the founder of Wondertouch. In 2018, Boris FX released a redesigned version of the product to a larger NLE/compositing market as part of Continuum (2019). The new Particle Illusion plug-in supports Adobe, Avid, and many OFX hosts.

== Silhouette ==
In September 2019, Boris FX merged with SilhouetteFX, Academy Award-winning developer of Silhouette, a high-end digital paint, advanced rotoscoping, motion tracking, and node-based compositing application for visual effects in film post-production. The acquisition integrated Silhouette's advanced rotoscoping and paint technology, recognized by the Academy of Motion Pictures, into Boris FX's suite of products, alongside Sapphire, Continuum, and Mocha Pro.

In May 2021, Boris FX released Silhouette 2021, the first version of Silhouette released by Boris FX to function both as a standalone application and as a plug-in for Adobe, Autodesk, Nuke, and other OFX hosts.

Silhouette has been used in the visual effects of films such as Avatar, Avengers: Infinity War, Blade Runner 2049, Ex Machina, and Interstellar.

== Optics ==
In June 2020, Boris FX launched Optics, its first plugin developed for photographers and digital artists. The plugin delivers cinematic effects to Adobe Photoshop and Adobe Lightroom and is also available as a standalone application. Optics includes over 160 effects in categories such as lighting, film stocks, lens effects, gobos, and color grades. In February 2022, Boris FX released Optics (v 2022), which adds Particle Illusion, a photorealistic particle engine featuring over 2000 presets.

== CrumplePop ==
CrumplePop was developed as an independent company specializing in audio restoration plugins before its acquisition by Boris FX. The software provides AI-powered tools for noise reduction and audio enhancement and integrates with editing programs such as Audacity, DaVinci Resolve, and Adobe Premiere Pro. It includes features for voice enhancement and removing background noise, pops, and echoes, offering solutions for both professional and beginner audio editors.

After acquiring CrumplePop, Boris FX added its noise reduction and restoration plugins into its suite of post-production tools. This addition expanded Boris FX's capabilities in audio cleanup and enhancement for video editors using supported host platforms.

== SynthEyes ==
In 2023, Boris FX acquired SynthEyes, a 3D camera tracking application developed by Andersson Technologies, expanding its suite of visual effects tools used in feature films, television, and streaming productions. The acquisition added SynthEyes to Boris FX's existing visual effects tools, which include Sapphire, Continuum, Mocha Pro, Silhouette, Optics, and CrumplePop. The acquisition aimed to enhance SynthEyes' development and support, leveraging Boris FX's resources while maintaining its standalone functionality.

SynthEyes has been used in the visual effects of films such as Pan’s Labyrinth, SpiderMan: Homecoming, The Curious Case of Benjamin Button, Deadpool, King Kong, Pirates of the Caribbean, Black Panther and more.

== Awards ==
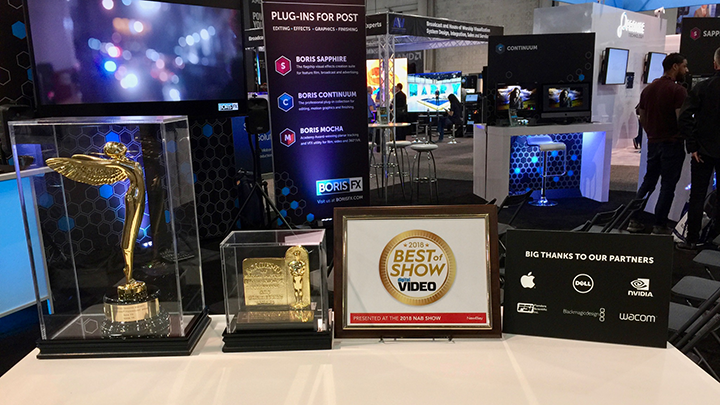
Boris FX displays 2013 Academy Award for Mocha, the 2018 Lumiere Award for Mocha VR, and the 2018 Best in Show from Digital Video Magazine.

=== 1995 ===
- Boris FX, Mac World, Digital Video Magazine, Best of Show Award

=== 2013 ===
- Mocha, Academy Awards, Scientific and Engineering Award
- Soundbite, Studio Daily Prime Award

=== 2016 ===
- Continuum, Post Magazine, NAB 2016 Post Pick

=== 2017 ===
- Boris FX, Boris Yamnitsky, Digital Video Industry Innovator Award
- Mocha VR, Post Magazine, NAB 2017 Post Pick
- Mocha VR, Digital Video, 2017 NAB Best of Show Award Winner

=== 2018 ===
- Mocha VR, Advanced Imaging Society, 2018 Lumiere Technology Award

=== 2019 ===
- Silhouette, Academy Awards, Technical Achievement Award
- Sapphire, Television Academy Engineering Emmy Award
- Mocha Pro, Television Academy Engineering Emmy Award
- Silhouette, Television Academy Engineering Emmy Award

=== 2024 ===
- Mocha Pro, NAB Show, NAB Best of Show Award Winner
