= Sony Creative Software =

American software company

Sony Creative Software Inc.
- Type: Subsidiary
- Industry: Software
- Founded: 2003; 23 years ago
- Headquarters: Middleton, Wisconsin, United States
- Area served: Worldwide
- Parent: Sony Corporation of America
- Website: sonycreativesoftware.com

Sony Creative Software is an American software company that develops various media software suites. Sony Creative Software was created in a 2003 deal with Madison-based media company Sonic Foundry in which it acquired its desktop product line, hired roughly 60% of employees, paid $18 million in cash, and took on certain liabilities and obligations.

As announced in May 2016, MAGIX Software GmbH has purchased majority of Sony Creative Software products, including the full Vegas Pro, Movie Studio, Sound Forge Pro, and ACID Pro product lines.

== Programs ==
- Catalyst Production Suite (video editing)
- Catalyst Edit (video editing)
- Catalyst Prepare (video preparation)
- Catalyst Browse (video browsing)

== Formerly owned programs ==
- Vegas Video (video editing)
- Sony Vegas Movie Studio (video editing), consumer version of Sony Vegas
- Sound Forge (advanced audio editing)
- ACID (loop based music creation), notable for its use of Acid Loops
- SpectraLayers (digital audio editing)
