= GenArts, Inc. =

VFX Company

- GenArts logo
- Type: Private
- Industry: Software
- Founded: 1996
- Founder: Karl Sims
- Defunct: September 2016
- Fate: Liquidated
- Headquarters: Cambridge, MA, USA
- Area served: Worldwide
- Key people: Karl Sims (Founder); Gary Oberbrunner (Chief Scientist)
- Products: Visual Effects Plug-ins
- Website: genarts.com

GenArts, Inc. was a Cambridge, Massachusetts-based developer of visual effects software for the film, broadcast, and advertising industries. GenArts's special effects software was used in the production of many movies, commercials, television shows, newscasts, and music videos. GenArts software and plugins integrated visual effects such as glows, lightning, fire, and fluids into post-production video editing software from companies like Apple, Adobe, Autodesk, and The Foundry.

GenArts was initially known for its role in high-end post production environments. In 2008, product development and a series of acquisitions broadened GenArts's focus, product portfolio, and customer base. Subsequently, GenArts created plugins developed for smaller budget video editing tools typically used by smaller studios, the videographer market, or creators of content distributed online on websites like YouTube.

Many Bollywood productions, like Little Krishna and Aladdin, have used software from GenArts. GenArts has been used in feature films like X-Men, the Lord of the Rings Trilogy, several Star Wars movies, and the Matrix Trilogy. It's also used in newscasts, music videos by Lady Gaga and Beyoncé, and television shows like Lost and CSI. The company has 29,000 customers, including Disney, Lucasfilm, Paramount Pictures, MTV, Univision, Televisa, and Warner Brothers.

== History ==
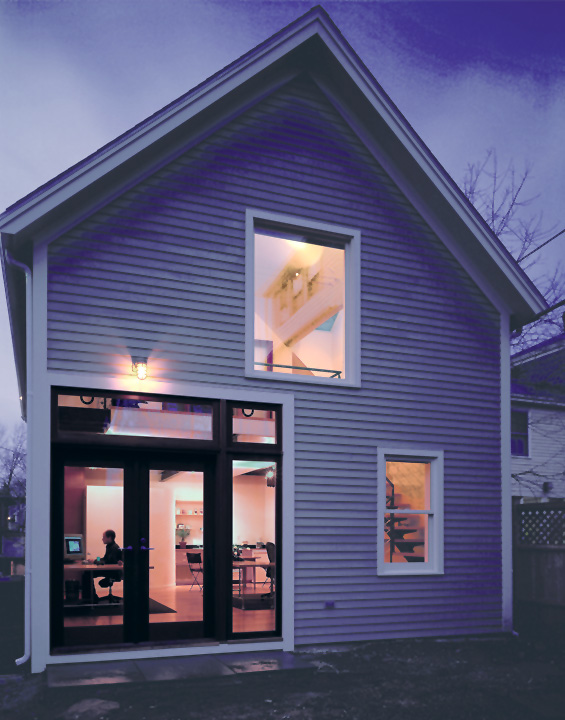
Karl Sims's barn and the first GenArts office space

Karl Sims founded GenArts, Inc. as Genetic Arts in 1996 in Cambridge, MA as a developer of Discreet Spark Plugins. In 1997, Gary Oberbrunner joined GenArts as its second employee. The company name was changed to GenArts in June, 1999. GenArts's first office space was in Karl's barn. By 1999, three years after the company was founded, GenArts had achieved significant commercial success, a pace of growth that founder Karl Sims says he did not expect. Karl won the MacArthur "genius grant" in the '90s for his work on artificial evolution.

Between 2000 and 2004, GenArts released Sapphire Plug-ins for Autodesk, Avid, After Effects, Shake, Final Cut Pro, Combustion, Premiere, Digital Fusion, Quantel with Synapse, and 844/x. The company had 220 image processing and synthesis effects by 2008. Prices for the software were also reduced.

After creating plugins for video editing software, GenArts made the shift to supporting applications such as Avid, Final Cut Pro, and Adobe After Effects that support a broader market of video creators.

In 2019, Karl Sims and Gary Oberbrunner each won an Emmy Award, recognizing their "outstanding achievement in engineering development" of Sapphire Plug-ins.

== Leadership and corporate strategy ==
In 2008, GenArts received funding from Insight Venture Partners and appointed a new CEO, Katherine Hays, to execute on a new growth strategy. That strategy involved consolidating a highly fragmented visual effects market into a standards-based, single vendor, off-the-shelf approach that Katherine believed would simplify visual effects for customers. The company also focused its own R&D on standards, often acquiring popular plugins for specific video editing software and developing them for other systems. After being a single product company (Sapphire) for over a decade, the new CEO appointment and growth strategy kicked off a series of acquisitions and new partner relationships.

- June 2008: Katherine Hays took office as CEO and founder Karl Sims moved to a new role on the company's board of directors.
- January 2009: GenArts acquired UK-based SpeedSix, which brought GenArts the Monsters and Raptors brand plugins. GenArts planned to extend those plugins to Avid and After Effects users.
- May 2009: The Open Effects Association was formed with GenArts as one of seven founding members striving to create open industry standards across the visual effects community. GenArts’s Chief Scientist Gary Oberbrunner oversaw as Director of the Association.
- June 2009: GenArts partnered with Lucasfilm to make digital effects for video games more consistent with the movie effects the games were based on.
- November 2009: GenArts acquired wondertouch, producers of a sprite-based particle emitter visual effect product called particleIllusion used to create fire, water, explosions, comets, clouds, pixie dust, fog, and other natural phenomena. wondertouch had 10,000 customers at the time.
- Early 2010: GenArts acquired the Tinder plugins from The Foundry, leaving The Foundry with their remaining Furnace, Keylight, and Ocula plugins. The brand had a 90% market penetration of Autodesk users. GenArts intended to expand Tinder to Adobe After Effects and other platforms.
- 2010: GenArts expanded the availability of different plugins on various editing software systems. Monsters became available on Adobe After Effects, Autodesk, Nuke, and OFX. Sapphire 5 became available on Adobe After Effects, Final Cut Pro, Nuke, Avid, Smoke, and OFX. particleIllusion was also released for Adobe After Effects on PC and Macintosh computers.
- March 2011: Former Artisan Entertainment CEO Amir Malin was appointed to the board of directors.
- April 2011: GenArts partnered with USC to provide their plugins to video arts students.
- January 2013: Genarts partnered with Vimeo to create Vivoom, allowing Vimeo users to apply Sapphire-type filters to their videos.
- April 2016: Katherine Hays departed GenArts to spin off Vivoom and was replaced by George Naspo as CEO.
- September 2016: Genarts was sold to Boris FX.

== Software ==
GenArts supported Adobe After Effects, Adobe Premiere Pro, Apple Final Cut Pro, Avid Systems, Autodesk systems, Nuke, OFX platforms, and Sony Vegas Pro. GenArts’s product lines included the Sapphire, Sapphire Edge, and Sapphire Accents brands. The acquired particleIllusion and Monsters GT brands were consolidated under Sapphire Accents:

- Sapphire: Had 220 effects in nine categories: Adjust, Blur & Sharpen, Composite, Distort, Lighting, Render, Stylize, Time, and Transitions.
- Sapphire Accents: A package of extra visual effects from the Monsters GT and particleIllusion products. The Monsters GT product had 50 effects that were similar to Sapphire—like fire, fluids, lightning, and blurs—but with specific, unique looks to those effects. particleIllusion was designed for particle effects and used by itself or as an After Effects plugin. Effects in particleIllusion were created through parameters in such a way that there are an infinite number of particle-based effects that were possible.
- Sapphire Edge: Used the same visual effects engine as the Sapphire product, but was designed for ease-of-use and only available for Sony Vegas Pro and Final Cut Pro.
- FX Central: An online library of pre-built, pre-configured looks that were updated each month.
