= Acid Pro =

Digital audio workstation

Acid Pro 11

- A screenshot of Acid Pro 11
- Developers: Sonic Foundry (1998), Sony Creative Software (2003), Magix Software (2016); Boris FX (2026)
- Stable release: 11.0.2
- Operating system: Windows 10 or 11 (64-bit only)
- Type: Digital audio workstation
- License: Proprietary
- Website: https://www.vegascreativesoftware.com/acid-pro/

Acid Pro (often stylized ACID) is a professional digital audio workstation (DAW) software program currently developed by Boris FX. It was originally called Acid pH1 and published by Sonic Foundry, later by Sony Creative Software as Acid Pro, and since spring 2018 by Magix as both Acid Pro and a simplified version, Acid Music Studio. Acid Pro 11 supports 64-bit architectures, and has MIDI, ASIO, VST, VST3, DirectX Audio, and 5.1 surround sound support.

== History ==
Acid was first launched in 1998, as Acid pH1, by Sonic Foundry in Madison, Wisconsin. It was a loop-based music sequencer, in which Acid Loop files could be simply drag-and-dropped then automatically adjust to the tempo and key of a song with virtually no sonic degradation.

A website for budding musicians using Acid technology was set up, named AcidPlanet.com. The software became very popular in the late 1990s and early 2000s among composers, producers, and DJs interested in quickly creating beats, music textures, or complete compositions and orchestrations, that would work with virtually any tempo or key signature.

Sonic Foundry sold its Acid, Vegas, Sound Forge, CD Architect, Siren, VideoFactory, ScreenBlast, and Batch Converter product lines to Sony Pictures Digital in July 2003; the merger resulted in the new Sony Creative Software division. Sony's Acid Pro 6 (released in the third quarter of 2006) introduced a full-digital audio workstation that also included MIDI and multitrack audio recording with full support for ASIO computer-audio and VST synthesizer-plugin standards.

On May 20, 2016, German company Magix Software GmbH announced they had acquired the majority of the products in the Sony Creative Software portfolio. These include Acid Pro, Vegas Pro, Movie Studio, and Sound Forge Pro. Acid Pro 8, the first version since Magix's acquisition, was announced on January 21, 2018, and released in spring 2018. The update came with new modern features including an enhanced interface, support for 64-bit, additional samples, VST3 support, over 20 DirectX audio effects, the ability to mix in 5.1 surround sound, and new features named Media Manager, BeatMapper, and Chopper.

On March 30, 2026, Boris FX acquires Vegas Pro, Sound Forge and Acid Pro.

Acid Pro 11 runs on 64-bit version of Microsoft Windows 10 or 11. Versions do not exist for macOS or Linux.

== Acid Loops ==
Acid Loop (trademark), also Acidized or Acidified loop (generic terms), refers to "loops", sound clips which can be repeated and transposed to form a song with minimal manual adjustment. Acidized loops contain tempo and key information, so that Acid can properly time-stretch and pitch-shift the clip to fit into an existing track structure. An Acidized loop is a specially prepared WAV audio file, which can be created using audio editing software such as Sound Forge.

The technology was created in 1998 for Sonic Foundry's original Acid pH1 software. Sony and Magix later sold series of Acidized loop sample CDs to be used with Acid Pro, as have various third-party companies. Since then, this looping technique has been adopted by the majority of other digital audio workstations on the market, sometimes with competing brand names for the feature, such as Cakewalk Sonar (calling it Groove Clips), and Cubase (calling it Audio Warp). Many DAWs can also directly support Acidized loops intended for use in Acid Pro.

== Notable users ==
- Halley Labs
- DJ Arana
- YoYo Honey Singh

== Other versions ==
- Acid Music Studio is a simplified, lower-cost version of Acid Pro. The latest version as of 2023 is Acid Music Studio 11.

== See also ==
- List of digital audio workstation software
- Comparison of digital audio editors
- List of music software
- Magix Music Maker
