= Boris Continuum Complete =

OFX Plugin Suite

Boris Continuum Complete is a special effects Plug-in package that worked in conjunction with Adobe Creative Suite, including CS6, Avid editing and finishing systems such as: Sony Vegas Pro, and Apple Final Cut Pro. Its effects are divided into 16 different categories: 3D Objects, Art Looks, Blur & Sharpen, Color & Tone, Film Style, Image Restoration, Key & Blend, Lights, Match Move, Particles, Perspective, Stylize, Textures, Time, Transitions and Warp. The last version, Boris Continuum Complete 9, was released on March 20, 2014.

== History ==
The initial Boris Continuum Complete package was created in 1995 and as a software based DVE solution for emerging NLEs. Ever since the package has expanded to include camera and light features as well.

== Features ==
FX Browser™

The FX Browser™ allows you to browse the entire BCC effects library either as a stand alone application or by trying each effect individually. The browser has a built-in browsing history that displays recent searches. The demonstrated effects are applied to moving video samples.

The Transition Group

BCC 9 delivers 24 new transitions groups: Blobs Wipe, Lens Distortion Wipe, Rings Wipe, Blur Dissolve, Lens Flare Dissolve, Ripple Dissolve, Checker Wipe, Lens Flare Round, Tile Wipe, Composite Dissolve, Lens Flare Spiked, Tritone Dissolve, Damaged TV Dissolve, Lens Flash, Twister, Film Glow Dissolve, Light Wipe, Vector Blur Dissolve, Flutter Cut, Rays Dissolve, Vignette Wipe, Grid Wipe, Ribbon Wipe, Water Waves Dissolve.

The Film Group

Added BCC Vignette. Adds luminocity and defocus controls.

BCC 2-Strip Color. Mimics the looks of classic Hollywood Films.

The Image Restoration Group

BCC Magic Sharp. Sharpens blurry images.

BCC Lens Correction. Removes fish-eye warp.

The Stylize Group

BCC Grunge and BCC Edge Grunge add grit, grime, and atmosphere to titles and clips.

The Keying and Composite Group

BCC Chromakey Studio. Creates junk mattes, green screen smoothing, final matte cleanups, chroma keying, light wraps, and color correcting.

The Lights Group

BCC Laser Beam. Engraves titles or and adds trace-on effects onto footage with fog and glows.

The Perspective Group

BCC Pan & Zoom. The rotates images in 3D and manages cropping and adjustment.

== Performance Speed ==
Filters tested in Avid Windows platform

FILTER Tested in Avid Windows platform	BCC8 TIME (Seconds)	BCC9 Time (Seconds)	% FASTER IN BCC 9
Glint	96	48	50.00%
Lens Flare	121	94	22.31%
Pin Art	159	143	10.06%
Damage TV	215	66	69.30%
Scanline	185	111	40.00%
Extruded Shatter	123	66	46.34%

== Effects ==
The latest version of Boris Continuum Complete features the following effects:

3D Objects	Art Looks	Blur and Sharpen	Color and Tone	Film Style
BCC Extruded EPS	BCC Artist’s Poster	BCC Directional Blur	BCC Deinterlace	BCC Fast Film Glow
BCC Extruded Spline	BCC Bump Map	BCC Gaussian Blur	BCC 3 Way Color Grade	BCC Fast Film Process
BCC Extruded Text	BCC Cartoon Look	BCC Lens Blur	BCC Brightness-Contrast	BCC Film Damage
BCC Layer Deformer	BCC Cartooner	BCC Lens Shape	BCC Color Balance	BCC Film Glow
BCC Type On Text	BCC Charcoal Sketch	BCC Motion Blur	BCC Color Correction	BCC Film Grain
	BCC Halftone	BCC Pyramid Blur	BCC Color Match	BCC Film Process
	BCC Median	BCC Radial Blur	BCC Color Palette	BCC Match Grain
	BCC Pencil Sketch	BCC Spiral Blur	BCC Colorize	BCC Two Strip Color
	BCC Posterize	BCC Unsharp Mask	BCC Correct Selected Color	BCC Vignette
	BCC Spray Paint Noise	BCC Z Blur	BCC Hue-Saturation-Lightness	
	BCC Tile Mosaic	BCC Invert Solarize	BCC Levels Gamma	
	BCC Water Color	BCC MultiTone Mixer		
		BCC Safe Colors		
		BCC Tritone		
		BCC Video Scope		
Image Restoration	Key & Blend	Lights	Match Move	Obsolete
BCC Dust and Scratches	BCC Alpha Process	BCC Alpha Spotlight	BCC Corner Pin	BCC Blur
BCC DV Fixer	BCC Boost Blend	BCC Edge Lighting	BCC Match Move	BCC Degrain
BCC Flicker Fixer	BCC Chroma Key	BCC Glare	BCC Witness Protection	BCC DeNoise
BCC Lens Correction	BCC Chroma Key Studio	BCC Glint		BCC Fire
BCC Magic Sharp	BCC Composite	BCC Glitter		BCC Glow
BCC Motion Key	BCC Composite Choker	BCC Laser Beam		BCC Lens Flare Advanced
BCC Noise Reduction	BCC Glow Matte	BCC Lens Flare 3D		BCC Lens Flare
BCC Optical Stabilizer	BCC Light Matte	BCC Light Sweep		BCC Light Zoom
BCC Pixel Fixer	BCC Light Wrap	BCC Lightning		BCC Noise Map
BCC Smooth Tone	BCC Linear Color Key	BCC Rays Cartoon		BCC Rough Glow
BCC UpRez	BCC Linear Luma Key	BCC Rays Puffy		
BCC Wire Remover	BCC Make Alpha Key	BCC Rays Radiant Edges		
	BCC Matte Choker	BCC Rays Radiant Spotlight		
	BCC Matte Cleanup	BCC Rays Ring		
	BCC PixelChooser	BCC Rays Ripply		
	BCC Premult	BCC Rays Streaky		
	BCC RGB Blend	BCC Rays Textured		
	BCC Star Matte	BCC Rays Wedge		
	BCC Super Blend	BCC Reverse Spotlight		
	BCC Two Way Key	BCC Spotlight		
		BCC Stage Light		
Particles	Perspective	Stylize	Textures	Time
BCC 2D Particles	BCC 3D Extruded Image Shatter	BCC Alpha Pixel Noise	BCC Brick	BCC Beat Reactor
BCC Comet	BCC 3D Image Shatter	BCC Color Choker	BCC Caustics	BCC Jitter Basic
BCC Organic Strands	BCC Cube	BCC Colorize Glow	BCC Cloth	BCC Jitter
BCC Particle Array 3D	BCC Cylinder	BCC Damaged TV	BCC Clouds	BCC Looper
BCC Particle Emitter 3D	BCC DVE Basic	BCC Drop Shadow	BCC Fractal Noise	BCC Optical Flow
BCC Particle System	BCC DVE	BCC Edge Grunge	BCC Granite	BCC Posterize Time
BCC Pin Art 3D	BCC Fast Flipper	BCC Emboss	BCC Mixed Colors	BCC Sequencer
BCC Rain	BCC Page Turn	BCC Glow Alpha Edges	BCC Noise Map 2	BCC Temporal Blur
BCC Snow	BCC Pan And Zoom	BCC Grunge	BCC Rays	BCC Time Displacement
BCC Sparks	BCC Sphere	BCC LED	BCC Reptilian	BCC Trails Basic
BCC Wild Cards	BCC Sphere Transition	BCC Misalignment	BCC Rock	BCC Trails
	BCC Z Space 1	BCC Mosaic	BCC Stars	BCC Velocity Remap
	BCC Z Space 2	BCC Multi Shadow	BCC Steel Plate	
	BCC Z Space 3	BCC Prism	BCC Veined Marble	
		BCC RGB Edges	BCC Weave	
		BCC RGB Pixel Noise	BCC Wood Grain	
		BCC Scanline	BCC Wooden Planks	
		BCC Scatterize		
Transitions	Warp			
BCC Blobs Wipe	BCC Bulge			
BCC Blur Dissolve	BCC Displacement Map			
BCC Burnt Film	BCC Morph			
BCC Checker Wipe	BCC Polar Displacement			
BCC Composite Dissolve	BCC Ripple			
BCC Criss-Cross Wipe	BCC Turbulence			
BCC Damaged TV Dissolve	BCC Twirl			
BCC Fast Film Glow Dissolve	BCC Vector Displacement			
BCC Film Glow Dissolve	BCC Video Morph			
BCC Flutter Cut	BCC Warp			
BCC Grid Wipe	BCC Wave			
BCC Lens Distortion Wipe				
BCC Lens Flare Dissolve				
BCC Lens Flare Round				
BCC Lens Flare Spiked				
BCC Lens Flash				
BCC Lens Transition				
BCC Light Wipe				
BCC Linear Wipe				
BCC Multi Stretch Wipe				
BCC Multi Stripe Wipe				
BCC Radial Wipe				
BCC Rays Dissolve				
BCC Rectangular Wipe				
BCC Ribbon Wipe				
BCC Rings Wipe				
BCC Ripple Dissolve				
BCC Swish Pan				
BCC Textured Wipe				
BCC Tile Wipe				
BCC Tritone Dissolve				
BCC Twister				
BCC Vector Blur Dissolve				
BCC Vignette Wipe				
BCC Water Waves Dissolve				
