= Karl Sims =

Computer graphics artist (born 1962)

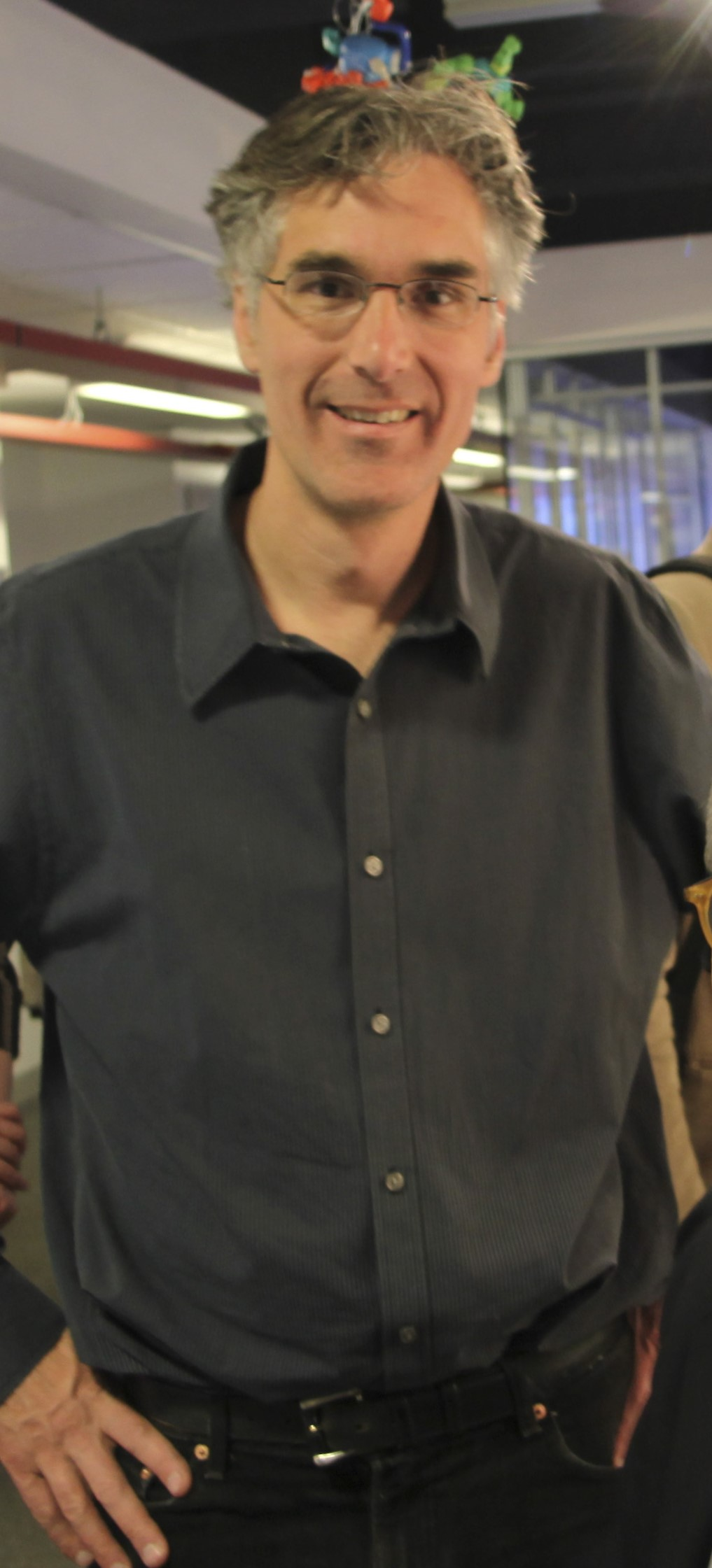
- Sims in 2009
- Born: 1962 (age 63–64)
- Education: Massachusetts Institute of Technology (B.S., M.S.)
- Occupations: Computer graphics artist, researcher
- Known for: Artificial life, particle systems, computer animation, genetic algorithms
- Website: www.karlsims.com

Karl Sims (born 1962) is a computer graphics artist and researcher, who is best known for using particle systems and artificial life in computer animation.

== Biography ==
Sims received a B.S. in Life Sciences from MIT in 1984, and a M.S. in computer graphics from the MIT Media Lab in 1987. After receiving his master's degree, Sims worked on special effects software at Whitney/Demos Productions and then was a co-founder of Optomystic. At Optomystic in 1989, Sims developed software for the Connection Machine 2 (CM-2) that animated the water from drawings of a deluge by Leonardo da Vinci, used in Mark Whitney's film Excerpts from Leonardo's Deluge.

Sims was later artist-in-residence from 1990 to 1996 at the supercomputer manufacturer and artificial intelligence company Thinking Machines. In 1996, Sims founded and became CEO of GenArts, a Cambridge, Massachusetts company that developed special effects plugins used in film and video production. In 2008 he moved to a role on the board of directors when Insight Partners acquired a majority stake in the company.

Sims' animations Particle Dreams and Panspermia used the CM-2 to animate and render various complex phenomena via particle systems. Panspermia was also used as the video for Pantera's 1994 cover of Black Sabbath's "Planet Caravan".

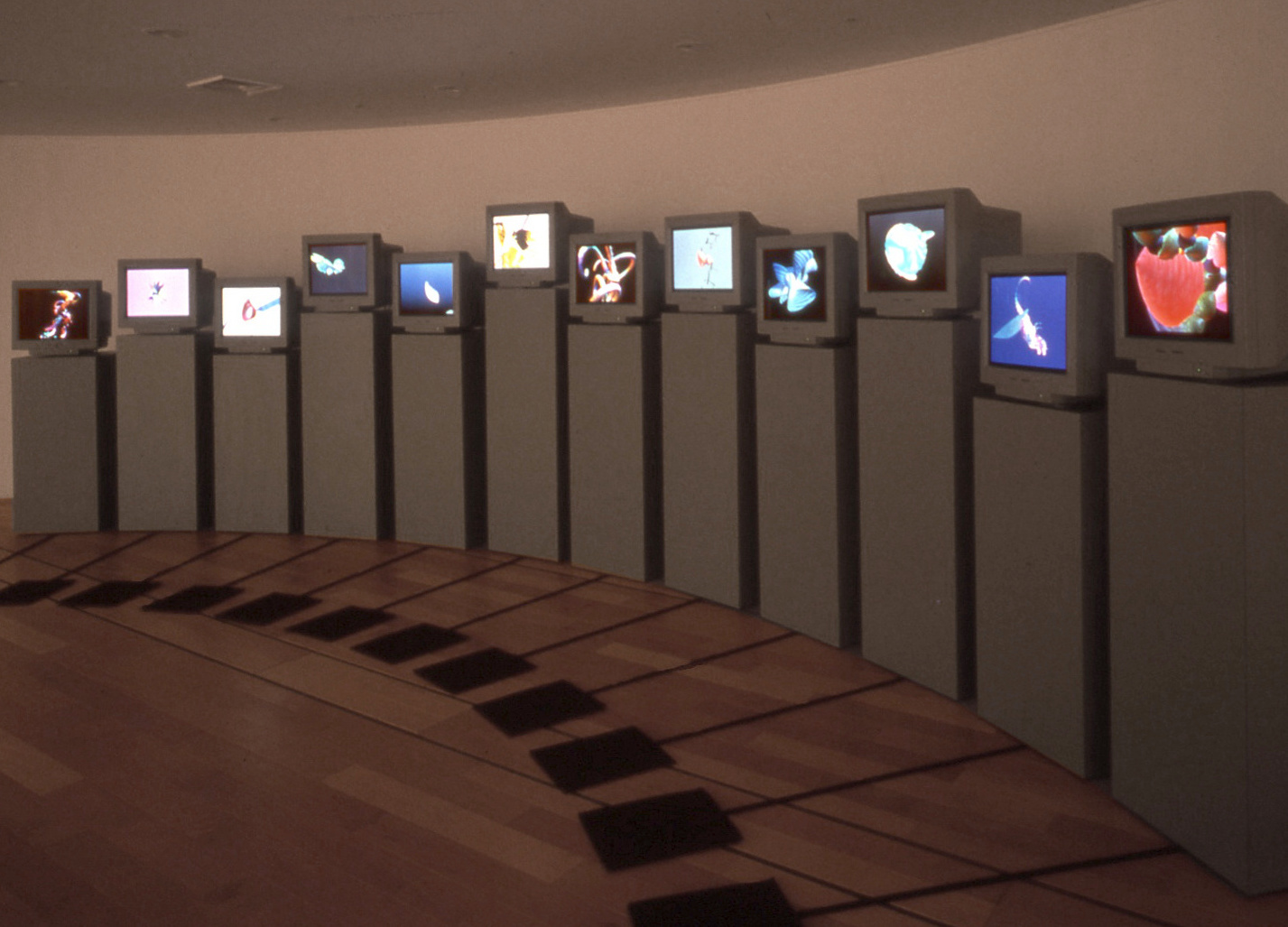
Galápagos installation

Sims wrote landmark papers on virtual creatures and artificial evolution for computer art. His virtual creatures used an artificial neural network to process input from virtual sensors and act on virtual muscles between cuboid 'limbs'. The creatures were evolved to display multiple modes of water and land based movements such as swimming like a sea snake or fish, jumping and tumbling (walking was not achieved). The creatures were also co-evolved in different species to compete for possession of a virtual cube, displaying the red queen effect. The cover of Chris Langton's 1995 book Artificial Life: An Overview uses an image of the creatures generated by Sims.

In 1997, Sims created the interactive installation Galápagos for the NTT InterCommunication Center in Tokyo. In this installation, viewers help evolve 3D animated creatures by selecting which ones will be allowed to live and produce new, mutated offspring.

His paper "Artificial Evolution for Computer Graphics" described the application of genetic algorithms to generate abstract 2D images from complex mathematical formulae, evolved under the guidance of a human. He used this method to create the video Primordial Dance – which, according to one published study with supplementary video, calls to mind the history of early 20th century abstraction among its several evolutionary themes – as well as parts of Liquid Selves. Genetic Images was an interactive installation also based on this method; it was exhibited at the Centre Georges Pompidou in Paris, 1993, as well as Ars Electronica and the Los Angeles Interactive Media Festival.

Sims received an Emmy Award in 2019 for outstanding achievement in engineering development. In 1998, he was awarded a MacArthur Fellowship. He has won two Golden Nicas at Prix Ars Electronica, in 1991 and in 1992. He has also received honors from Imagina, the National Computer Graphics Association, the Berlin Video Festival, NICOGRAPH, Images du Futur, and other festivals.

He is married to MIT professor Pattie Maes.

== Filmography ==
- Flow exhibit demonstration, 2020 (Video on YouTube)
- Seven Experiments in Procedural Animation, 2018 (Video on YouTube)
- Evolved Virtual Creatures, 1994 (Video on YouTube)
- Liquid Selves, 1992 (Video on YouTube)
- Primordial Dance, 1991 (Video on YouTube)
- Panspermia, 1990 (Video on YouTube) (Incorporated into Beyond the Mind's Eye, 1992) )
- Particle Dreams, 1988 (Video on YouTube)
- Excerpts from Leonardo's Deluge, 1989 – software developer
- Locomotion Studies, 1987 (Video on YouTube)

== Publications ==
- Karl Sims (August 1990). "Particle Animation and Rendering Using Data Parallel Computation". SIGGRAPH '90 Proceedings: 405–413.
- Karl Sims (1992). "Choreographed Image Flow". Journal of Visualization and Computer Animation. 3: 31–43. doi:10.1002/vis.4340030106.
- Karl Sims (July 1991). "Artificial Evolution for Computer Graphics". SIGGRAPH '91 Proceedings: 319–328.
- Karl Sims (July 1994). "Evolving Virtual Creatures". SIGGRAPH '94 Proceedings: 15–22.
- Karl Sims (1994). Brooks & Maes (ed.). "Evolving 3D Morphology and Behavior by Competition". Artificial Life IV Proceedings. MIT Press: 28–39.
- Karl Sims (1992). "Interactive Evolution of Dynamical Systems". Proceedings of the First European Conference on Artificial Life. MIT Press: 171–178.
- Karl Sims (1993). "Interactive Evolution of Equations for Procedural Models". The Visual Computer. Springer-Verlag: 466–476.
- Crow, Demos, Hardy, McLaughlin, Sims (1989). "3D Image Synthesis on the Connection Machine". International Journal of High Speed Computing. World Scientific: 329–347.
- Lehman, Clune, Misevic,..Sims,.. (2020). "The Surprising Creativity of Digital Evolution". Artificial Life. 26 (2). MIT Press: 274–306. arXiv:1803.03453. doi:10.1162/artl_a_00319. PMID 32271631. S2CID 4519185.

== See also ==
- Artificial life
- Evolved virtual creatures
- Evolutionary robotics
