= Magix =

German software company

Magix Software GmbH
- Type: Private (GmbH)
- Industry: Software
- Founded: 1994; 32 years ago
- Headquarters: Berlin, Germany
- Key people: Robert Rutkowski (CEO); Gary Rebholz (CPO, Video); Johannes Ernst (CPO, Audio)
- Products: Magix Music Maker; Magix Movie Edit Pro
- Parent: RM Equity Partners
- Website: magix.com

Magix Software GmbH (or simply Magix, stylized in all caps) is a German software company specializing in video editing, audio editing, DAW and photo slideshow software. The company is based in Berlin, with locations in Madison, Wisconsin, Dresden and Lübbecke, as well as Huizen in the Netherlands.

== Product history ==
In 1994, the first edition of Magix Music Maker was released. Starting in 1996, the Magix product range was extended to include software for designing, editing, presenting and archiving photos and videos. Magix products and services were first offered in other European countries and the USA starting in 1997.

In 1997, the first video editing software by the company, Magix Movie Edit Pro (also known as "Magix Video Deluxe" in Europe), was released. In 2002, the first version of Magix Photos on CD & DVD (now known as "Magix Photostory Deluxe") was released. This program is for creating photo slideshows.

Magix has also released VR video editing software and several Android mobile apps (Camera MX, Acid Beatbox, Looply for music, video editing and animation for younger audiences).

In May 2016, Magix acquired Vegas Pro, Movie Studio, Sound Forge and ACID Pro from the Sony Creative Software product range.

In May 2018, private equity firm Capiton announced that it had acquired a majority stake in Magix Software GmbH together with its management.

In 2023, Magix filed for insolvency and in 2025, VEGAS Creative Software and Magix Software GmbH were acquired by RM Equity Partners.

In 2026, Boris FX acquired Vegas Pro, Sound Forge, and Acid Pro. The acquisition added Vegas Pro, Sound Forge, and Acid Pro to Boris FX's software portfolio.

== Product overview ==
Video Editing Video Pro X Magix Movie Edit Pro (Video Deluxe) Fastcut Video Easy	Music Production & Editing Music Maker Music Maker Jam	Photo & Graphic Designing Photo Manager Deluxe Photostory Deluxe Page & Layout Designer Designer Pro X Web Designer
