= Sony of Canada =

Wholly owned subsidiary of Sony Group Corporation

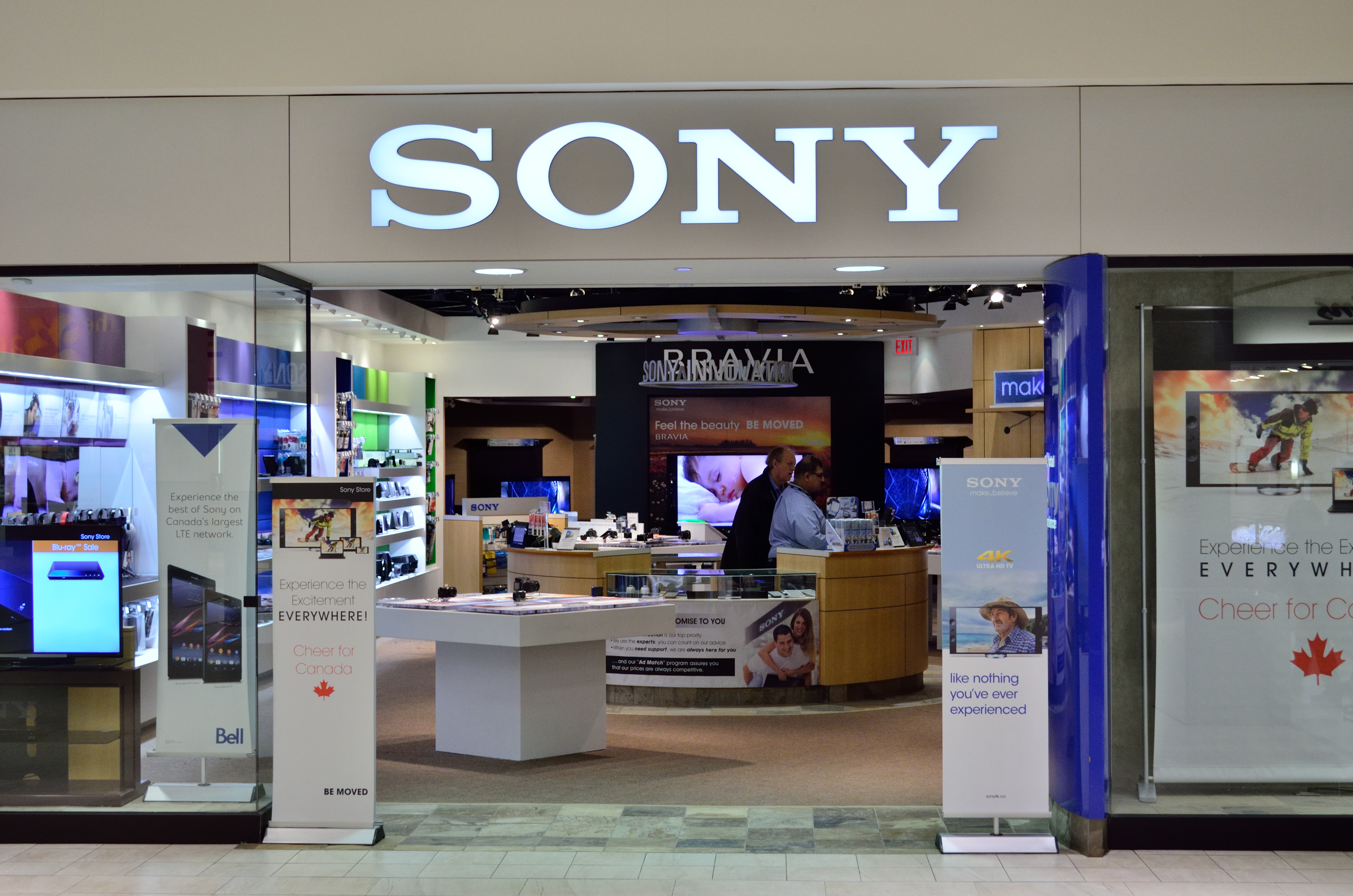
Sony Style retail store at Markville Shopping Centre, Ontario, in 2014

Sony of Canada ULC (French: Sony du Canada) is the Canadian subsidiary of the Japanese company Sony Group Corporation. Sony provides products that include Blu-ray players, BRAVIA televisions, Cyl digital cameras, Handycam Camcorders, VAIO computers, broadcast cameras, IPELA security cameras and video conferencing and many more products. Sony is an entertainment company that includes electronics, music, movies, games and online businesses. Sony Canada is headquartered in Toronto.

Established in 1955, Sony Canada evolved from General Distributors, which had been founded as Gendis in Winnipeg. In collaboration with the founders (Akio Morita and Masaru Ibuka) of Sony Corporation, Albert D. Cohen and his five brothers negotiated early distribution of Sony's first transistor radio, TR55 in 1955. The Cohens also negotiated for T. Eaton Co. Limited to be the first company to retail Sony products outside Japan. Originally headquartered in Winnipeg, Sony of Canada brought Walkman portable music players, Trinitron Televisions and Handycam Camcorders to the Canadian market. The Cohen family stake in Sony Canada was eventually sold to Sony corporation in 1995 for $207 million. Sony Canada opened its first retail store in 1999.

In 2015, Sony Canada announced the closure of all its 14 stores, impacting approximately 90 jobs. Sony Canada accepts products for recycling at no additional cost. The company has been awarded for its environmental impact.
