= Vegas Pro =

Video editing software

- Vegas Pro 15.0 running on Windows 10
- Original author: Sonic Foundry
- Developers: Sonic Foundry (1999–2003); Sony Creative Software (2003–2016); MAGIX Software (2016–2026); Boris FX (2026–present)
- Stable release: v2026.0 Build 66 / March 27, 2026
- Written in: C#, JScript
- Operating system: Microsoft Windows
- Platform: x86-64; .NET Framework 4.0
- Type: Video editing software
- License: Proprietary
- Website: www.vegascreativesoftware.com/vegas-pro/

Vegas Pro (formerly stylized as VEGAS Pro and known as Sony Vegas and Sony Vegas Pro) is a professional video editing software package for non-linear editing (NLE), designed to run on the Microsoft Windows operating system.

The first release of Vegas Beta was on June 11, 1999. Vegas was originally developed as a non-linear audio editing application.

The software was originally published by Sonic Foundry until May 2003, when Sony purchased Sonic Foundry and formed Sony Creative Software. On May 24, 2016, Sony announced that Vegas was sold to MAGIX, which formed VEGAS Creative Software, to continue support and development of the software. As of the end of March 2026, it was publicly announced that Boris FX had taken ownership of Vegas Pro.

== Features ==
Vegas does not require any specialized hardware to run properly, allowing it to operate on any Windows computer that meets the system requirements.

== History ==
Vegas Pro 1.0b running on Windows NT 4.0

Vegas 1.0 was released after a brief public beta by Sonic Foundry on July 23, 1999 at the NAMM Show in Nashville, Tennessee as an audio-only tool with a particular focus on re-scaling and resampling audio. It supported formats like DivX and Real Networks RealSystem G2 file formats. Martin Walker from Sound on Sound described working in Vegas 1.0 as a "very pleasurable experience, especially since so many functions are highly intuitive" though also criticizing some features as hard to figure out due to the lack of a central help file.

Later, on June 12, 2000, Vegas Video and Audio 2.0 (also referred to as just Vegas 2.0) was released, with its beta releasing earlier that year on April 10. This was the first version of Vegas to include video-editing tools and was also the first to have a low-cost "LE" version alongside the regular release. The LE releases would continue through version 3.0 of Vegas but would be discontinued by the release of Vegas 4.0. Vegas 3.0 was released the next year on December 3, and added new video effects, features for ease-of-use with DV, and support for editing Windows Media files. Vegas 4.0 was released on 6 February 2003 and added application scripting, advanced color correction, 5.1 surround sound mixing, and Steinberg ASIO support. This was the last release under the Sonic Foundry name after it sold much of its software suite, including Sound Forge and Acid Pro, to Sony Pictures Digital for $18 million later in 2003.

Vegas 5.0 was released on April 19, 2004. Sony was also experimenting with 64-bit at this time and ported Vegas Pro 8.0 to 64-bit systems under the name "Vegas Pro 8.1". Vegas Pro 9.0 added support for 4K resolution and pro camcorder formats like Red and XDCAM EX.

Vegas Pro 10 was released in 2010 with stereoscopic 3D editing, image stabilization, OpenFX plugin support, real-time audio event effects, and a few UI changes. This was the last release to include support for Windows XP. Vegas Pro 11 was released the next year on 17 October, with GPGPU video acceleration, enhanced text tools, enhanced stereoscopic/3D features, RAW photo support, and new event synchronization mechanisms. Vegas Pro 12 would add two new configurations: Vegas Pro 12 Edit, for "Professional Video and Audio Production"; and Vegas Pro 12 Suite, for "Professional Editing, Disc Authoring, and Visual Effects Design". Vegas Pro 13 would be the last version released with Sony branding after the acquisition of much of Sony Creative Software's library by Magix.

Magix released version 14 on September 20, 2016.

Vegas Pro 15 was released on August 28, 2017. Vegas Pro 16 has some new features including file backup, motion tracking, improved video stabilization, 360° editing and HDR support.

Magix released a subscription model for using Vegas named "Vegas Pro 365" on January 17, 2018, although the perpetual licence is still an option for customers.

== Version history ==
Version	Release Date	Company	Notes
Vegas Beta	June 11, 1999	Sonic Foundry	initially called a "Multitrack Media Editing System."
Vegas 1.0	July 23, 1999	Sonic Foundry	audio-only tool with a particular focus on rescaling and resampling audio
Vegas Video beta	April 10, 2000	Sonic Foundry	the first version of Vegas to include video-editing tools
Vegas Video 2.0	June 12, 2000	Sonic Foundry	
Vegas Video 3.0	December 3, 2001	Sonic Foundry	Added new video effects, disc burning.
Vegas 4.0	February 6, 2003	Sonic Foundry	
Vegas 4.0b	April 2003	Sonic Foundry	
Sony Vegas 4.0e	November 2003	Sony	First release from Sony
Sony Vegas 5.0	April 19, 2004	Sony	
Sony Vegas 6.0	April 18, 2005	Sony	
Sony Vegas 7.0	September 27, 2006	Sony	
Sony Vegas Pro 8.0	September 10, 2007	Sony	
Sony Vegas Pro 8.1	September 10, 2008	Sony	
Sony Vegas Pro 9.0	May 21, 2009	Sony	
Sony Vegas Pro 10	October 11, 2010	Sony	
Sony Vegas Pro 11	October 17, 2011	Sony	Updated features include GPGPU acceleration of video decoding, effects, playback, compositing, pan/crop, transitions, and motion. Other improvements were to include enhanced text tools, enhanced stereoscopic/3D features, RAW photo support, and new event synchronisation mechanisms.
Sony Vegas Pro 12	November 9, 2012	Sony	
Sony Vegas Pro 13	April 11, 2014	Sony	
VEGAS Pro 14	September 20, 2016	MAGIX	
VEGAS Pro 15	August 28, 2017	MAGIX	
VEGAS Pro 16	August 27, 2018	MAGIX	file backup, motion tracking, improved video stabilization, 360° editing and HDR support.
VEGAS Pro 17	August 5, 2019	MAGIX	Nested timelines, improved video stabilisation, planar motion tracking/video tracking.
VEGAS Pro 18	August 3, 2020	MAGIX	Known for stability issues
VEGAS Pro 19	August 18, 2021	MAGIX	
VEGAS Pro 20	August 10, 2022	MAGIX	Added collaboration tools
VEGAS Pro 21	August 14, 2023	MAGIX	
VEGAS Pro 22	July 29, 2024	MAGIX	
VEGAS Pro 23	September 9, 2025	MAGIX	
Vegas Pro 2026	March 27, 2026	Boris FX	released via a new three-tier system : Vegas Pro, Vegas Pro Plus, and Vegas Pro Ultimate. All three tiers are offered as a subscription, while only Vegas Pro and Vegas Pro Plus are available as a perpetual license. This release added a title pack, several machine learning features, and upgraded ProRes support:

== Reception ==
Major broadcasters have utilized the software, such as Nightline with Ted Koppel.

== See also ==
- List of video editing software
- Comparison of video editing software
