= SilhouetteFX =

2020 editing software

- Developer(s): SilhouetteFX LLC
- Stable release: 2025.5 / September 2025; 1 month ago
- Operating system: Linux, Windows, Mac OS X
- License: Proprietary
- Website: SilhouetteFX

SilhouetteFX began as a rotoscoping tool for the visual effects industry. SilhouetteFX has been expanded to include capabilities facilitating paint, warping and morphing, 2D to 3D conversion and alternative matting methods. As of V6, SilhouetteFX retains all of the aforementioned capabilities now embedded in a node-based digital compositing application.

== Context ==
SilhouetteFX is named for the art form associated with Étienne de Silhouette (July 8, 1709 – 1767). The fundamental output of a rotoscoping program is a matte which when viewed appears as a silhouette of an object to be treated in isolation of the remainder of an image. The image density of the matte determines how a compositing operation effect will be applied. Image pixels corresponding to brighter pixels in the matte will be treated differently than image pixels corresponding to darker pixels in the matte VFX.

== Company ==
The developer, SilhouetteFX LLC, was formed as a partnership between principals from Digital Film Tools and Profound Effects, Inc. Partners include Paul Miller, Marco Paolini, Peter Moyer and Perry Kivolowitz.

In 2019, Boris FX, a leading developer of VFX, compositing, titling, video editing, and workflow tools for broadcast, post-production, and film professionals acquired SilhouetteFX.

== Awards ==
- 2019 Academy Award for Technical Achievement - Academy of Motion Picture Arts and Sciences
- 2019 Engineering Emmy - Academy of Television Arts & Sciences

== Partial list of notable films ==
- King Kong (2005): Weta
- Eragon (2006): Weta
- X-Men: The Last Stand (2006): Weta
- Fantastic 4: Rise of the Silver Surfer (2007): Weta
- The Golden Compass (2007): Tippett Studio
- The Water Horse (2007): Weta
- Cloverfield (2008): Tippett Studio
- The Spiderwick Chronicles (2008): Tippett Studio
- Beverly Hills Chihuahua (2008): Tippett Studio
- Bedtime Stories (2008): Tippett Studio
- The Chronicles of Narnia: Prince Caspian (2008): Weta
- The Dark Knight (2008): Double Negative
- The Day the Earth Stood Still (2008): Weta
- Avatar (2009): Framestore
- Coraline (2009): Laika
- District 9 (2009): Weta
- The Twilight Saga: New Moon (2009): Tippett Studio
- Clash of the Titans (2010): Framestore
- Harry Potter and the Deathly Hallows: Part 1 (2010): Rising Sun Pictures, Framestore
- The Twilight Saga: Eclipse (2010): Tippett Studio
- Gulliver's Travels (2010): Weta
- Predators (2010): Weta
- The A-Team (2010): Weta
- Harry Potter and the Deathly Hallows: Part 2 (2011): Rising Sun Pictures, Tippett Studio
- The Smurfs (2011): Tippett Studio
- The Twilight Saga: Breaking Dawn - Part 1 (2011): Tippett Studio
- Rise of the Planet of the Apes (2011): Weta
- X-Men: First Class (2011): Weta
- Abraham Lincoln: Vampire Hunter (2012): Weta
- John Carter (2012): Double Negative
- Prometheus (2012): Weta
- Skyfall (2012): Double Negative
- The Avengers (2012): Weta
- Total Recall (2012): Double Negative
- The Hobbit: An Unexpected Journey (2012): Weta
- The Twilight Saga: Breaking Dawn - Part 2 (2012): Tippett Studio
- Titanic 3D (2012): StereoD
- Gravity (2013): Framestore
- Iron Man 3 (2013): Weta
- Fast & Furious 6 (2013): Double Negative
- Man of Steel (2013): MPC Film, Weta
- The Hunger Games: Catching Fire (2013): Double Negative / Weta
- The Hobbit: The Desolation of Smaug (2013): Weta
- The Lone Ranger (2013): MPC Film
- The Wolverine (2013): Weta
- World War Z (2013): MPC Film
- 300: Rise of an Empire (2014): MPC Film
- Dawn of the Planet of the Apes (2014): Weta
- Edge of Tomorrow (2014): Framestore, MPC Film
- Exodus: Gods and Kings (2014): MPC Film
- Godzilla (2014): Double Negative
- Guardians of the Galaxy (2014): Framestore, MPC Film
- Interstellar (2014): Double Negative
- Night at the Museum: Secret of the Tomb (2014): MPC Film
- Robocop (2014): Framestore
- The Amazing Spider-Man 2 (2014): MPC Film
- The Hobbit: The Battle of the Five Armies (2014): Weta
- The Hunger Games: Mockingjay: Part 1 (2014): MPC Film
- X-Men: Days of Future Past (2014): MPC Film
- Avengers: Age of Ultron (2015): Framestore
- Ex Machina (2015): Double Negative
- Fantastic Four (2015): BOT VFX, MPC Film, Weta
- Furious Seven (2015): MPC Film, Weta
- Hunger Games: Mockingjay - Part 2 (2015): BOT VFX
- Jupiter Ascending (2015): Framestore, Double Negative
- Jurassic World (2015)
- Maze Runner: Scorch Trials (2015): Weta
- Mission Impossible-Rogue Nation (2015): Double Negative
- Spectre (2015): MPC Film
- Terminator Genisys (2015): Double Negative
- The Hunger Games: Mockingjay Part 2 (2015): MPC Film
- The Martian (2015): BOT VFX, Framestore, MPC Film
- The Revenant (2015): MPC Film
- Arrival (2016): Framestore
- Batman vs Superman: Dawn of Justice (2016): MPC Film, Weta
- Ben Hur (2016): BOT VFX
- Fantastic Beasts and Where to Find Them (2016): Framestore, MPC Film
- Ghostbusters (2016): MPC Film
- Gods of Egypt (2016): BOT VFX
- Godzilla (2016): MPC Film
- Independence Day: Resurgence (2016): BOT VFX, MPC Film
- Miss Peregrine's Home for Peculiar Children (2016): BOT VFX, MPC Film
- Passengers (2016): MPC Film
- Suicide Squad (2016): MPC Film
- Sully (2016): MPC Film
- Tarzan (2016): MPC Film, Framestore
- The BFG (2016): Weta
- The Jungle Book (2016): MPC Film, Weta
- The Legend of Tarzan (2016): Framestore
- X-Men: Apocalypse (2016): MPC Film
- Alien Covenant (2017): Framestore, MPC Film
- Beauty and the Beast (2017): Framestore
- Blade Runner 2049 (2017): Framestore, MPC Film
- Ghost in the Shell (2017): Framestore, MPC Film
- Guardians of the Galaxy Vol. 2 (2017): Framestore, Weta
- Jumanji: Welcome to the Jungle (2017): MPC Film
- Justice League (2017): MPC Film, Weta
- King Arthur: Legend of the Sword (2017): Framestore, MPC Film
- Kingsman: The Golden Circle (2017): MPC Film
- Murder on the Orient Express (2017): MPC Film
- Paddington 2 (2017): Framestore
- Pirates of the Caribbean: Dead Men Tell No Tales (2017): MPC Film
- The Dark Tower (2017): MPC Film
- The Mummy (2017): MPC Film
- Thor: Ragnarok (2017): Framestore
- Transformers: The Last Knight (2017): MPC Film
- Valerian and the City of a Thousand Planets (2017): Weta
- War for the Planet of the Apes (2017): Weta
- xXx: The Return of Xander Cage (2017): MPC Film
- Wonder Woman (2017): MPC Film
- Aquaman (2018): MPC Film
- Avengers: Infinity War (2018): Weta
- Deadpool 2 (2018): Framestore, Weta
- Mary Poppins Returns (2018): Framestore
- Maze Runner: The Death Cure (2018): Weta
- Mowgli: Legend of the Jungle (2018): Framestore
- Mortal Engines (2018): Weta
- Rampage (2018): Weta
- Skyscraper (2018): MPC Film
- Underwater (2018): MPC Film
- 1917 (2019): MPC Film
- Ad Astra (2019): MPC Film, Weta
- Avengers: Endgame (2019): Framestore, Weta
- Captain Marvel (2019): Framestore
- Dumbo (2019): Framestore, MPC Film
- Fantastic Beasts: The Crimes of Grindelwald (2018): Framestore
- Fast & Furious Presents: Hobbs & Shaw (2019): Framestore
- Gemini Man (2019): Weta
- Godzilla: King of the Monsters (2019): MPC Film
- Jumanji: The Next Level (2019): Weta
- Maleficent: Mistress of Evil (2019): MPC Film
- Spider-Man: Far from Home (2019): Framestore
- Terminator: Dark Fate (2019): Weta
- X-Men: Dark Phoenix (2019): MPC Film
- Artemis Fowl (2020): MPC Film
- Dolittle (2020): MPC Film
- Mulan (2020): Weta
- Sonic the Hedgehog (2020): MPC Film
- Black Widow (2021): Weta
- Cruella (2021): MPC Film
- Eternals (2021): Weta
- Ghostbusters Afterlife (2021): MPC Film
- Godzilla vs. Kong (2021): MPC Film, Weta
- Jungle Cruise (2021): Weta
- Mortal Combat (2021): MPC Film
- No Time To Die (2021): Framestore
- Shang-Chi and the Legend of the Ten Rings (2021): Weta
- Spider-Man: No Way Home (2021): Framestore, MPC Film
- The King's Man (2021): Framestore, Weta
- The Suicide Squad (2021): Weta
- The Tomorrow War (2021): Weta
- Zack Snyder's Justice League (2021): Weta
- The Last Duel (2021): MPC Film
- Avatar: The Way of Water (2022): Weta
- Beast (2022): Framestore
- Black Adam: (2022) Weta
- Black Panther (2022): Weta
- Doctor Strange in the Multiverse of Madness (2022): Framestore, Weta
- Elvis (2022): Framestore, MPC Film
- Fantastic Beasts: The Secrets of Dumbledore (2022): Framestore
- Glass Onion: A Knives Out Mystery (2022): Weta
- Kimi (2022): Weta
- No Exit (2022): Weta
- Nope (2022): MPC Film
- GUILLERMO DEL TORO'S Pinocchio (2022): MPC Film
- The Batman (2022): Weta
- Thor: Love and Thunder (2022): Framsetore, Weta
- Top Gun: Maverick (2022): Framestore, MPC Film
- Ant-Man and the Wasp Quantamania (2023): MPC Film
- Aquaman and the Lost Kingdom (2023): MPC Film, Weta
- Barbie (2023): Framestore
- Cocaine Bear: (2023): Weta
- Ferrari (2023): MPC Film
- Guardians of the Galaxy Vol. 3 (2023): Framestore, Weta
- Haunted Mansion (2023): Framestore
- Peter Pan & Wendy (2023): Framestore
- Rebel Moon – Part One: A Child of Fire (2023): Framestore, Weta
- Shazam! Fury of the Gods: (2023): Framestore, Weta
- The Creator (2023): Weta
- The Flash (2023): Weta
- The Little Mermaid (2023): MPC Film, Weta
- The Marvels (2023): Framestore, Weta
- Transformers: Rise of the Beasts (2023): MPC Film, Weta
- Wonka (2023): Framestore
- Argylle (2024): MPC Film
- Atlas (2024): MPC Film
- Bad Boys: Ride or Die (2024): Framestore
- Beatlejuice Beatlejuice (2024): Framestore
- Civil War (2024): Framestore
- Deadpool & Wolverine (2024): Framestore
- Fly Me to the Moon (2024): Framestore
- Furiosa (2024): Framestore
- Godzilla X Kong: The New Empire (2024): Weta
- IF (2024): Framestore
- Kingdom of the Planet of the Apes (2024): Weta
- Rebel Moon - Part Two: The Scargiver (2024): Framestore, Weta
- Spaceman (2024): MPC Film
- The Fall Guy (2024): Framestore
- Wicked (2024): Framestore
