= Sony Life =

Japanese insurance company

Sony Life Insurance Co., Ltd.

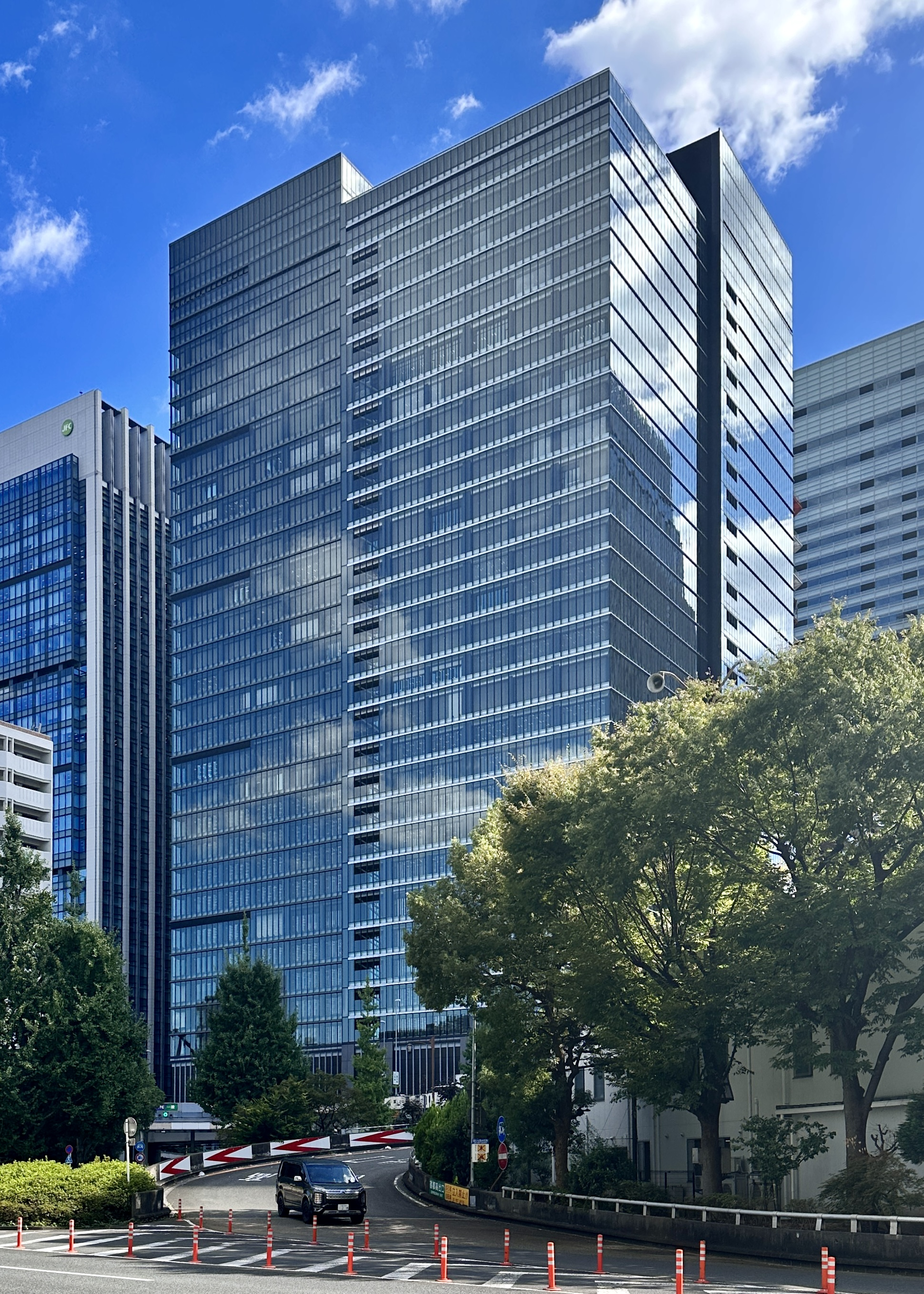
- Industry: Insurance
- Founded: August 1979
- Headquarters: Tokyo, Japan
- Net income: ¥33.7 billion (2009)
- Parent: Sony Financial Holdings
- Website: www.sonylife.co.jp

Sony Life Insurance Co., Ltd. (ソニー生命保険株式会社; Sony Seimei Hoken Kabushiki Gaisha) is a Japanese insurance company, initially founded in 1979 as a joint venture between the Sony Group Corporation and Prudential Financial headquartered in Tokyo.

== History ==
Sony Prudential Life Insurance Co., Ltd. (Sony Prudential Life) was established in August 1979 as a joint venture between Sony and Prudential Financial. This company began operations in April 1981 with its Lifeplanner system. Sony and Prudential agreed to end their joint venture in July 1987. In September 1987, Sony Prudential Life was renamed to Sony Pruco Life Insurance Co, Ltd. In April 1991, Sony renamed this company to Sony Life Insurance Co, Ltd. (Sony Life).

Sony Life established Sony Life Insurance (Philippines) Corporation in August 1998. The company is a wholly owned subsidiary of Sony Life.

In 2001, Sony Life accounted for 5% of Sony's overall revenue.

Sony Life opened an office in Beijing in October 2008. It opened an office in Taipei in July 2009.

== Shareholders ==
- Sony Financial (100%)
