= Magix Movie Edit Pro =

Video editing software

MAGIX Movie Edit Pro
- Developer: Magix Software GmbH
- Release: 2001
- Stable release: 2021 / August 30, 2021
- Operating system: Windows XP or later
- Type: Video editing software
- License: Proprietary
- Website: MAGIX Movie Edit Pro Site

Movie Edit Pro (also known as Magix Video Deluxe in Europe and sometimes Magix Movie Studio in the United States) is a video editing software developed by Magix for semi-professional and DIY users for Windows PC. It is the best selling video software in Europe, and is most famous for its ease-of-learn and rendering stability. The first version was published in 2001. According to the developer, it applied the principles of non-destructiveness and object orientation to a video editing program for the first time.

The latest versions are Movie Edit Pro 2019, Movie Edit Pro Plus 2019, Movie Edit Pro Premium 2019.

The last update was released on December 10, 2018, which added dynamic title animation and free design colors for tracks and objects in a video.

== Features (Version 2019) ==
=== Similarities of both Versions ===
- miniDV, HDV and AVCHD compatible
- 4K support
- storyboard and timeline-oriented editing
- freely adjustable user interface
- Screenshot
- one way color correction
- title editor
- Keyframing
- batch processing
- burn DVD and Blu-ray Disc with animated menus
- AVCHD disc export
- Scrubbing
- Chroma keying
- Upload to YouTube and Vimeo in Full HD

== Features (version 2019) ==
- Dynamic title animation
- Active destination track import
- Intel GPU hardware acceleration
- openFX support
- 64-bit support
- Export to SD cards
- H.264 decoding
- improved Image stabilization
- Xavcs video compatibility
- Chroma keying
- Burn to DVD, AVCHD or Blu-ray disc
- Scrubbing
- 4K support

=== Differences between both Versions ===
	Movie Edit 2015	Movie Edit 2015 Plus/Premium
Number of multimedia tracks	32	99
Multicam Editing	No	Yes
Stereo3D workflow	No	Yes
Professional movie templates	No	Yes
Preview rendering	No	Yes
Proxy editing	No	Yes
Dolby Digital	Stereo	Stereo/5.1

== Supported file formats ==
	Import	Export
Video	AVI, DV-AVI, M2TS, MPEG-1, MPEG-2, MPEG-4, MTS, MXV, MJPEG, QuickTime, WMV (HD), VOB	AVI, DV-AVI, MJPEG, MPEG-1, MPEG-2, MPEG-4, QuickTime, WMV (HD)
Audio	WAV, MP3, OGG, WMA, MIDI, 5.1 Surround Sound	WAV, MP3, 5.1 Surround Sound (only Plus and Premium version)
Images	JPEG, BMP, GIF, TIF, TGA	JPEG, BMP

== System requirements ==
=== Minimum ===
- Processor with 2.0 GHz
- 1 GB RAM
- 2 GB free hard disk memory and a DVD drive for program installation
- Graphics card with a screen resolution of at least 1024 x 768
- Internet connection required for activating and validating the program

=== Recommended ===
- Quad-core processor with 2.8 GHz
- 4 GB RAM
- Dedicated graphics card with 512 MB memory

=== Supported devices ===
- FireWire interface for use with DV/HDV camcorders
- USB camcorders (DVD/hard disk/memory card) and webcams
- Video, TV or graphics card with a video input for digitizing analog sources
- Blu-ray, DVD-R/RW, DVD+R/RW, DVD-RAM or CD-R/RW burners
