= Sony Financial Group =

Japanese financial company, a subsidiary of Sony

Sony Financial Group Inc.

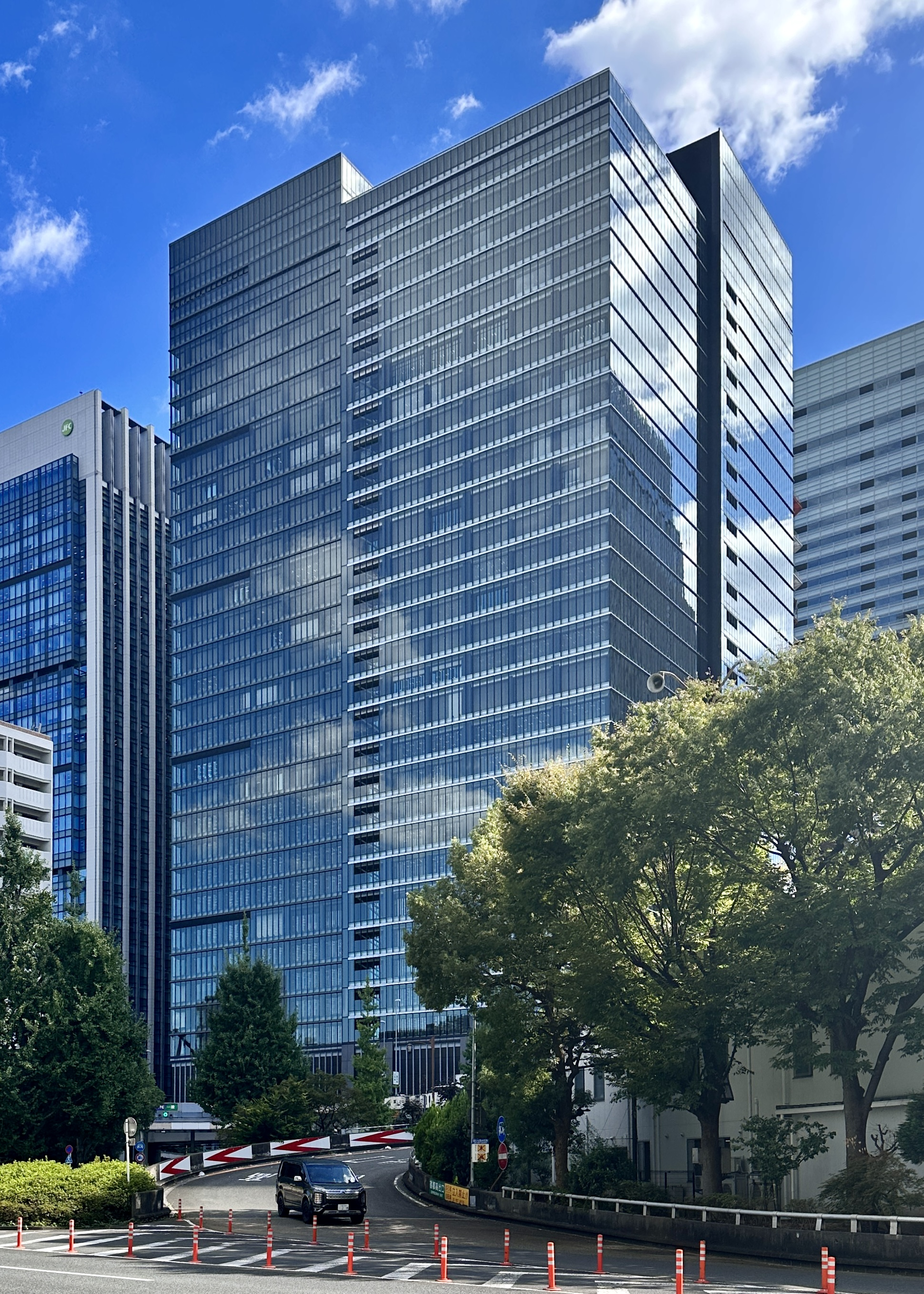
- Headquarters at Otemachi Financial City
- Native name: ソニーフィナンシャルグループ株式会社
- Romanized name: Sonī Finansharu Gurūpu Kabushiki-gaisha
- Formerly: Sony Financial Holdings Inc. (2004–2021)
- Type: Public
- Traded as: TYO: 8729
- Industry: Financial services
- Founded: 1 April 2004; 22 years ago
- Headquarters: Ōtemachi, Chiyoda-ku, Tokyo, Japan
- Key people: Shigeru Ishii (President)
- Products: Financial products
- Total assets: ¥ 14.5 trillion
- Owner: Sony (20%)
- Number of employees: 13,500
- Subsidiaries: Sony Life Insurance; Sony Assurance; Sony Bank; Sony Lifecare; Sony Financial Ventures
- Website: www.sonyfg.co.jp

Sony Financial Group Inc. (Note: Japanese: ソニーフィナンシャルグループ株式会社, Hepburn: Sonī Finansharu Gurūpu Kabushiki-gaisha), formerly known as Sony Financial Holdings Inc. (Note: Japanese: ソニーフィナンシャルホールディングス株式会社, Hepburn: Sonī Finansharu Hōrudingusu Kabushiki-gaisha), is a Japanese holding company headquartered in Tokyo, Japan. It operates various businesses, including both life and non-life insurances, online banking, credit card settlement, nursing care, and venture capital.

== History ==
In March 2004, Sony received approval from the Financial Services Agency of Japan to establish a holding company under the Insurance Business Act and a holding company under the Banking Act. The following month, Sony established Sony Financial Holdings through a corporate split. This placed Sony Life Insurance, which became a Sony subsidiary in 1996, Sony Insurance, which was established in 1998, and Sony Bank, which was established in 2001, under the same umbrella.

In 2020, Sony acquired Sony Financial Holdings through a tender offer, delisting it from the First Section of the Tokyo Stock Exchange and making it a wholly owned subsidiary.

In 2021, Sony Financial Holdings changed its name to Sony Financial Group.

== Subsidiaries ==
- Sony Life Insurance
  - Sony Life Communications
  - Sony Life Singapore
- Sony Assurance
- Sony Bank
  - Sony Payment Services
    - SmartLink Network
    - S.RIDE
- Sony Lifecare
  - Lifecare Design
  - Proud Life
- Sony Financial Ventures
