= Sony Bank =

Japanese commercial bank

Sony Bank, Inc.

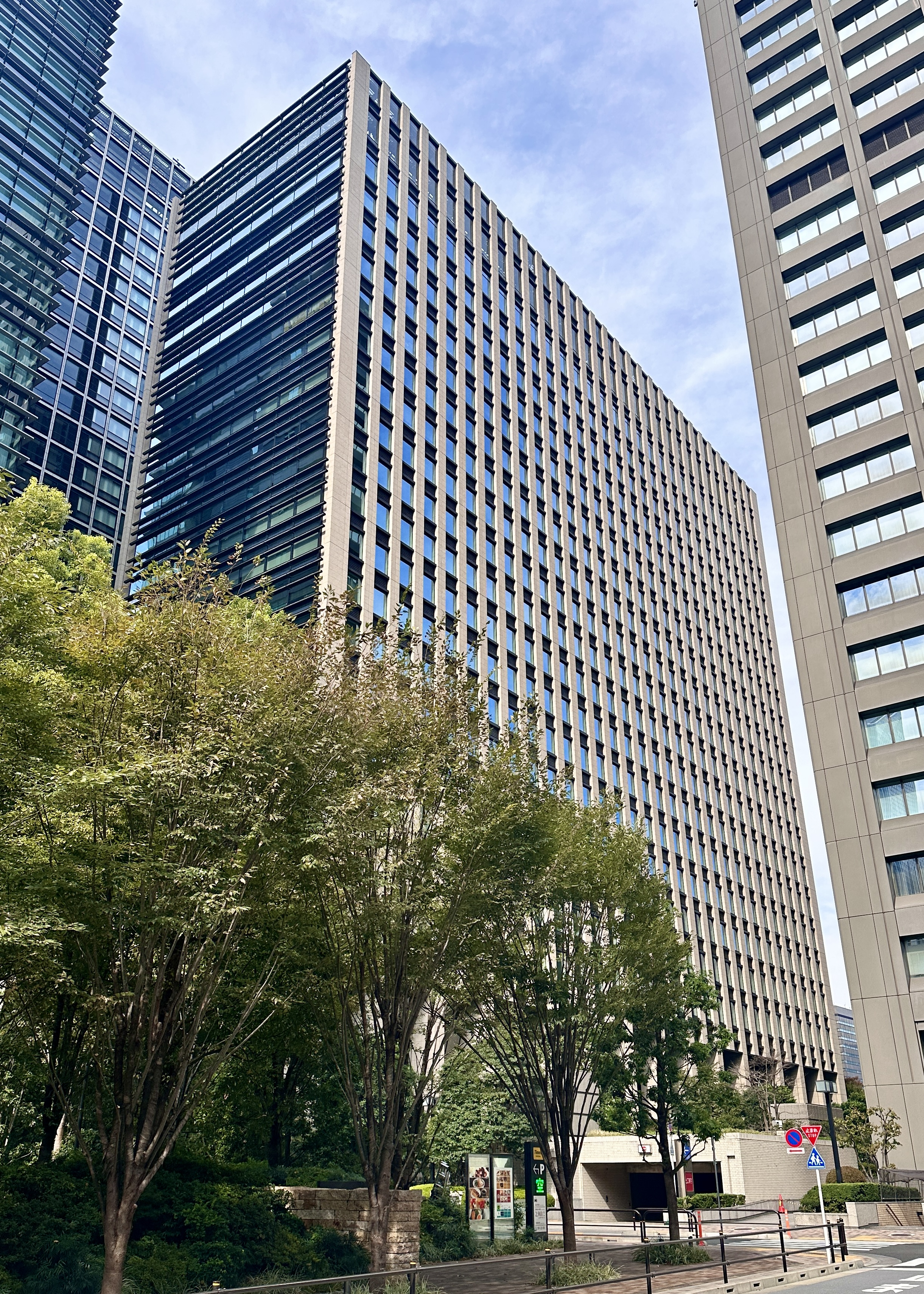
- Headquarters in Chiyoda, Tokyo
- Native name: ソニーバンク, ソニー銀行
- Type: Subsidiary
- Industry: Banking
- Founded: June 11, 2001
- Headquarters: Nishikichō, Tokyo, Japan
- Key people: Keiji Minami (President and CEO)
- Products: Foreign currency deposits, investment trust, home loans
- Net income: ¥6.6 billion (2019)
- Total assets: ¥3,079.4 billion (2019)
- Number of employees: 455 (2015)
- Parent: Sony Financial Group
- Website: sonybank.net

Sony Bank, Inc. (ソニー銀行株式会社) is a Japanese commercial bank established in April 2001. It operates as a direct bank and has no physical branches or ATMs. It is one of the largest online banks in Japan and a subsidiary of Sony Financial Group. Its main business is offering online banking with foreign currency deposits, investment trusts, and home loans.

== History ==
A reduction in regulations in Japan at the end of the 1990s encouraged a number of companies to enter the banking sector for the first time.

Sony faced challenges as it began Sony Bank. In 2001, when Sony Bank was founded, Web use was limited in Japan as compared with the United States. Only 24 million people used the Internet every month at that time. Still, the company remained hopeful that infrastructure would improve. Sony claimed its move into banking went hand-in-hand with its shift from a manufacturing focus to a focus on content such as films and music.

Sony announced its new banking unit in March 2000. The bank started doing business on June 11, 2001. The company began with ¥37.5 billion of capital. It had around 80 employees at the time. It added 340 online accounts during its first hour of operation. At the time, the company offered yen-deposit accounts, investment trusts, card loans, and bank payments. It hoped to expand into foreign currency deposit accounts, credit cards, and housing loans by 2002. It also hoped to allow its customers to use automated teller machines from the Japan Post.

In 2001, Sony Bank hoped to accumulate 400,000 customers by 2004. In February 2001, the company had hoped to accumulate $5.2 billion in deposits; it adjusted that figure downward to $4.1 billion in deposits three months later. In February 2001, the company aimed to gain $8.6 billion in deposits by 2006. Analysts at the time were generally upbeat about the prospects for the bank. Raymond H. Graber of TowerGroup suggested the bank could synergize with the other operations of Sony Financial. Still, Paul Jamieson of Gomez Advisors warned that customers would have high expectations for Sony Bank, given Sony's existing reputation for the ease of use and elegant design of its products.

Shigeru Ishii was appointed and served as the first president of Sony Bank.

As of 2005 the company faced weak earnings.

By 2007, Sony Bank had accumulated 500,000 customers. That year, Sony planned to add an electronic trading platform.

In 2011, Sony had considered expanding its banking business into the Australian market, only to abandon the idea in 2013.

In 2019, Sony Bank started an English-language online banking service to meet the need of increasing foreign residents in Japan.

In October 2025, Sony Bank applied for a banking license in the U.S. with the goal of issuing dollar-pegged stablecoins.

== Ownership ==
Upon the bank's founding in 2001, Sony owned 80% of the bank. By 2005, its stake had risen to 84.2% and Sony Financial Holdings became the intermediate holding company of the bank.

Sumitomo Mitsui Financial Group owned a 16% initial stake in the company and allowed Sony Bank customers to access its 7,600 automated teller machines. Sony Group is considered to be a Mitsui keiretsu. Sumitomo Mitsui had reduced its share to 12.6% by 2005.

Upon the bank's founding in 2001, JPMorgan Chase owned a 4% stake in the bank. JPMorgan had hoped to expand its asset and wealth management services in Japan. The company reduced its ownership to 3.2% by 2005. It sold off its entire stake in 2005, claiming to have discussed the move with Sony in advance. By the divestiture made by JP Morgan, Sony increased its ownership to 87.4%.

In 2008, Sony Bank became a wholly owned subsidiary of Sony Financial Holdings after Sumitomo Mitsui sold its remaining stake to Sony.
