= Sonic Foundry =

Software company

Sonic Foundry Inc.
- Traded as: OTC Pink: SOFO (since 2023); Nasdaq: SOFO
- Industry: Information technology and services
- Founded: 1991
- Defunct: December 2025
- Fate: Liquidated
- Headquarters: Madison, Wisconsin
- Area served: Worldwide
- Number of employees: 250 (2019)
- Website: www.sonicfoundry.com

Sonic Foundry, Inc was an information technology company that produced software for distance learning and corporate communication. It was headquartered in Madison, Wisconsin. It was known for originally developing Vegas Pro and Sound Forge.

== History ==
Sonic Foundry was founded in 1991 and was headquartered in Madison, Wisconsin. The company sold Vegas Pro and Sound Forge, along with other programs (including Acid) to Sony Pictures Digital for US$18 million in 2003, which led to the creation of Sony Creative Software.

As of August 2022, the company produced Mediasite, Video Solutions, and Global Learning Exchange (GLX), and had announced a product called Vidable.

Its four brands included Mediasite, Video Solutions (formerly Mediasite Events), Vidable, and Global Learning Exchange (GLX)

In January 2024, Sonic Foundry announced the sale of Mediasite and Video Solutions to Enghouse Systems Ltd. taking effect February 2024.

Sonic Foundry filed for receivership in March of 2024, but was liquidated in December of 2025, ending the company's existence.
