= Magix Music Maker =

Digital audio workstation

- Developer: Magix Software GmbH
- Initial release: 1994; 32 years ago
- Stable release: 2023 Free Edition, 2023 Plus Edition, 2023 Premium Edition
- Operating system: Windows 8 or later
- Type: Music sequencer
- License: Freemium
- Website: www.magix.com/gb/music/

Magix Music Maker is a commercial digital audio workstation (DAW) designed by the company Magix for the consumer sector. The program is branched from Samplitude, Magix's professional digital audio workstation. Music Maker was first published in 1994. By 2006, it had sold over a million copies in varying versions.

Aside from the core Music Maker program, versions have been made for different types of music. The software was also ported to PlayStation 2.

== Features ==
Music Maker is an entry-level music production app to make songs in various genres. It has the following features:

- Sound pools (these are libraries of samples in different genres, they are usually not royalty-free, but some are now labelled as such)
- Sound import (digital music files, real instruments or vocals)
- Mixer, MIDI editor, synthesizer
- Sound processing plug-ins (equalization, dynamic compression, reverb, delay, chorus, flanger, distortion, limiting, vocoder)
- VST Virtual instruments (high-quality midi guitars, basses, drums, pianos, and more).

=== Supported file formats and interfaces ===
Import/Export	WAV, MP3, Ogg Vorbis, WMA, AIFF, QuickTime, MIDI, CD-DA, BMP, JPEG, AVI, MXV, WMV
Interfaces	ASIO, VST, Rewire, DirectX

=== Windows system requirements ===
- Processor with 2 GHz, or higher
- 2 GB RAM
- Hard disk drive with 700 MB free space
- Graphics card with 1280x768 minimum resolution at 16-bit color
- 16-bit sound card

== Recent editions ==
For 2023, Magix developed three core editions of Music Maker for Windows:

- Music Maker 2023 Free: The free edition of the music software and currently download-only. The included features are free sound loops, a Beatbox, 3 instruments, 6 effects, and 8 tracks.
- Music Maker 2023 Plus: The plus edition of the music software and currently download-only. The included features are free sound loops, 1 soundpool, and 1 collection, a Beatbox, 5 instruments, 20 effects, and unlimited tracks.
- Music Maker 2023 Premium: The premium edition of the music software and currently download-only. The included features are free sound loops, 3 soundpools, and 1 collection, Beatbox Pro 2, Modern EQ, Wizard FX Suite, 7 instruments, 36 effects, unlimited tracks, 64 bit support and AI SongMaker.

Others include the 80s Edition, Trap Edition, EDM Edition, and Hip Hop Edition.
