= Sound Forge =

Audio editing software

- Sound Forge 8, 2005
- Original author: Sonic Foundry
- Developer: Boris FX
- Stable release: 14 Sound Forge Pro April 2020; 15 Sound Forge Audio Studio February 2021 16 Sound Forge Audio Studio January 2022 / January 24, 2022; 4 years ago
- Operating system: Microsoft Windows, macOS
- Type: Digital audio editor
- License: Proprietary
- Website: vegascreativesoftware.com/sound-forge/

Sound Forge (formerly known as Sonic Foundry Sound Forge, and later as Sony Sound Forge) is a digital audio editing suite by Boris FX, which is aimed at the professional and semi-professional markets. There are two versions of Sound Forge: Sound Forge Pro 12 released in April 2018 and Sound Forge Audio Studio 13 (formerly known as Sonic Foundry's Sound Forge LE) released in January 2019. Both are well known digital audio editors and offer recording, audio editing, audio mastering and processing.

Sound Forge was developed in 1992 by Monty R. Schmidt, audio enthusiast, and founder of Sonic Foundry. It was started as shareware for just $25, and sold hundreds of copies in a short time. The software initially had Windows 3.x support, but after version 3.0 all support for 16-bit Windows was dropped. Additionally, Windows 95 support was dropped after Sound Forge 5.0. The last version made by Sonic Foundry was Sound Forge 6.0 in 2002.

In 2003, Sonic Foundry faced losses and tough competition from much larger companies, and agreed to sell its desktop audio and music production product family to Sony Pictures Digital for $18 million.

On May 20, 2016, Sony announced that it would be selling the bulk of its creative software suite, including Sound Forge Pro, to Magix GmbH & Co. Magix announced via Facebook that their first new version of Sound Forge Audio Studio (Sound Forge Audio Studio 12) was released August 2017.

On March 30, 2026, Boris FX announced that it had acquired Sound Forge from Magix Software GmbH.

== Features ==
- Multi-channel or multitrack Recording
- Voice activity detection using artificial intelligence
- Disc Description Protocol export
- High resolution audio support: 24-Bit, 32-Bit, 64-bit (IEEE float) 192 kHz
- Support for a wide variety of file formats: DSF (DSD), AA3/OMA (ATRAC), GIG (GigaSampler instrument), IVC (Intervoice), MP4 (including Apple Lossless), MPEG‑2 transport stream and PCA (Sony Perfect Clarity Audio). For working with audio‑for‑video, Pro 12 includes versatile video file support AVI, WMV, MPEG‑1 and MPEG‑2 (in PAL or NTSC) file formats
- DirectX and VST3 plugin support. Version 12 includes a vinyl restoration plug-in and Mastering Effects Bundle, powered by IZotope
