= Don'cha Hear Them Bells =

- 1953 45 single release on Capitol Records.

Single by Les Paul and Mary Ford
- Released: 1953
- Label: Capitol
- Songwriter(s): Les Paul

Les Paul and Mary Ford singles chronology
"Johnny (Is The Boy for Me)" (1953)	"Don'cha Hear Them Bells" (1953)	"The Kangaroo" (1953)

"Don'cha Hear Them Bells" is a 1953 song written by Les Paul and recorded by Les Paul and Mary Ford. The song was released as a single.

== Background ==
The song was released as a 7" vinyl 45 single on Capitol Records, 45-11878, F2614, backed with "The Kangaroo", in 1953. The recording was also released as a 10" 78 as 2614. The song was composed by Les Paul and was published by the Iris-Trojan Music Corporation in New York. "Don'cha Hear Them Bells" reached no. 13 on the Billboard Jockey Chart in November, 1953 in a four-week chart run and no. 28 on the Cash Box chart in a 10-week chart run. The flip side "The Kangaroo" reached no. 23 on the Cash Box chart.

== Album appearances ==
The song appeared on the 1991 album Les Paul: The Legend and the Legacy on Capitol Records and on the 2007 release Les Paul: The Essential Collection on West End Records.

1953 sheet music cover, Iris-Trojan Music Corp., New York.
