= Song in Blue =

Single by Les Paul and Mary Ford
- B-side: "Someday Sweetheart"
- Released: 1955
- Recorded: September 2, 1954
- Genre: Traditional pop
- Length: 2:15
- Label: Capitol
- Songwriters: Les Paul, Monty Ford, Celia Ryland

1955 Capitol Records promotional ad for the single.

"Song in Blue" is a 1955 song co-written by Les Paul and recorded by Les Paul and Mary Ford. The song was released as a single.

== Background ==
The song was released as a 7" vinyl 45 single on Capitol Records, 45-13229, F3015, backed with "Someday Sweetheart", in 1955. The song was composed by Les Paul, Monty Ford, and Celia Ryland and was published by the Iris-Trojan Music Corporation in New York. The single reached #17 on the Cash Box singles chart in January, 1955 during an 8-week chart run. The single reached no. 71 on the Record World pop singles chart the same year. "Someday Sweetheart" reached no. 39 on the Cash Box chart in a two-week chart run and no. 79 on the Record World chart.

== Sources ==
- Jacobson, Bob. Les Paul: Guitar Wizard. Madison, Wisconsin: Wisconsin Historical Society Press, 2012.
- Shaughnessy, Mary Alice. Les Paul: An American Original. New York: W. Morrow, 1993.
- Wyckoff, Edwin Brit. Electric Guitar Man: The Genius of Les Paul. Genius at Work! Berkeley Heights, N.J.: Enslow Publishers, 2008.
