= Les Paul and Mary Ford =

Husband-and-wife musical duo

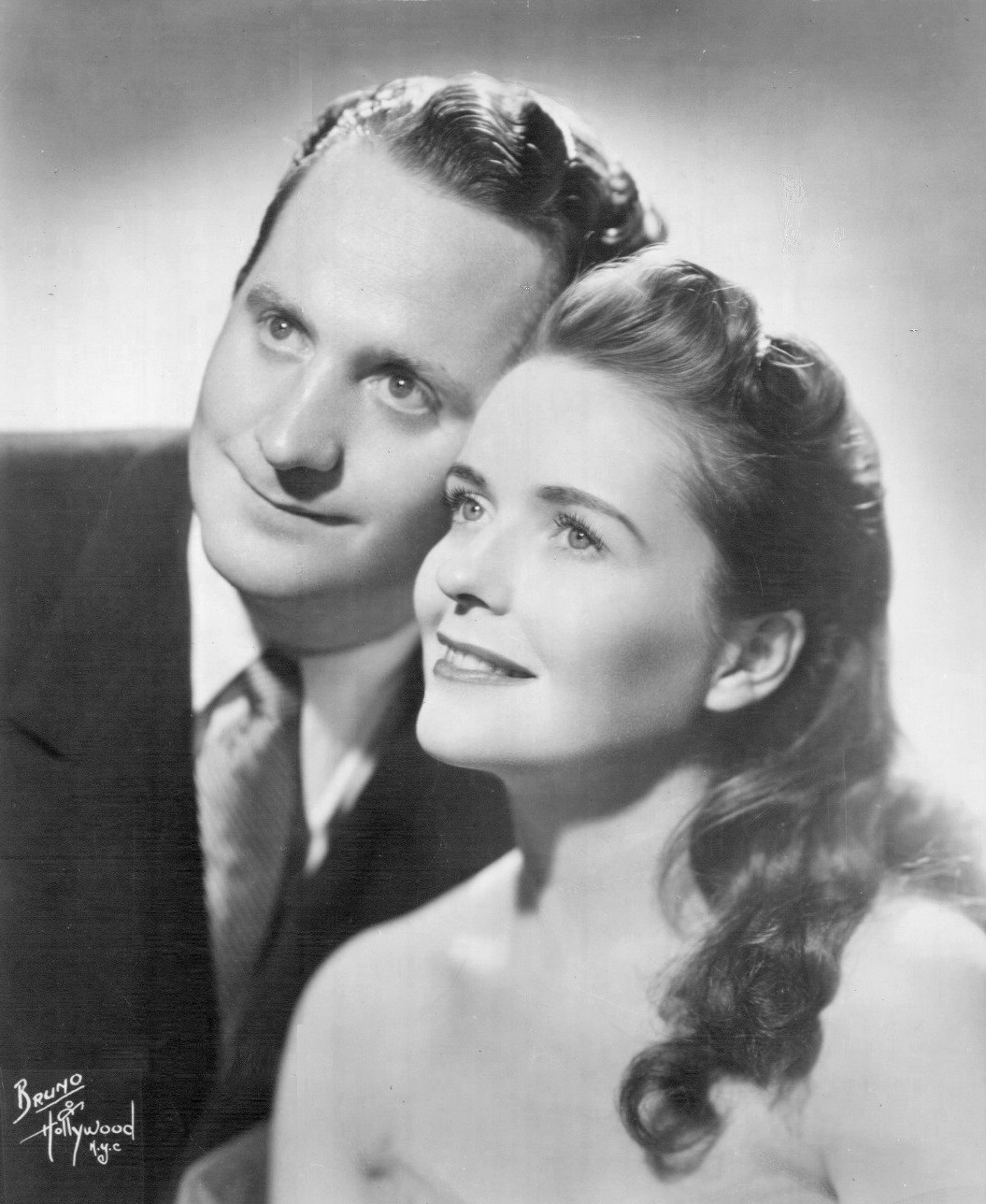
Les Paul and Mary Ford in 1953

Les Paul and Mary Ford were a popular 1950s husband-and-wife musical duo who performed and recorded during 1950–1963. They both sang and played guitar.

Ford and Paul were music superstars during the first half of the 1950s, putting out 28 hits for Capitol Records between 1950 and 1957, including "Tiger Rag", "Vaya con Dios" (11 weeks at No. 1), "Mockin' Bird Hill" (top 10), "How High the Moon" (nine weeks at No. 1), "Bye Bye Blues" and "The World Is Waiting for the Sunrise".

== Background ==
The couple were introduced to each other by Gene Autry in 1945 and were married on December 29, 1949. They first appeared in the pop charts in 1950. Between the years 1950 and 1954, Les Paul and Mary Ford had 16 top-ten hits. They had five top-ten hits within nine months. "Tennessee Waltz", "Mockin' Bird Hill", "How High the Moon" (#1 for nine weeks), "The World Is Waiting for the Sunrise" and "Whispering". From August 1952 to March 1953 they had five more top-ten hits; "My Baby's Coming Home", "Lady of Spain", "Bye Bye Blues", "I'm Sitting on Top of the World" and "Vaya Con Dios" (#1 for 11 weeks). Their 1954 version of "I'm a Fool to Care" went to No. 6, and was featured in a memorable Southern Comfort commercial in 2013 that got over 1 million views on YouTube.

In 2009, they were inducted into the Hit Parade Hall of Fame.

Paul and Ford are famous for creating a makeshift recording studio in their garage. In their garage studio, they used multitrack recording to record many of their hits including ‘Lover’, ‘Nola’, ‘Brazil’ and ‘Whispering' with only the two of them.

Paul and Ford divorced acrimoniously in December 1964, which also ended the collaboration between the two.

The duo have a star at 1541 Vine Street in the Recording section of the Hollywood Walk of Fame.

== Radio and television programs ==
Paul had hosted a 15-minute radio program, The Les Paul Show, on NBC in 1950, featuring his trio (himself, Ford, and rhythm player Eddie Stapleton) and his electronics, recorded from their home and with gentle humour between Paul and Ford bridging musical selections, some of which had already been successful on records, some of which anticipated the couple's recordings, and many of which presented dazzling re-interpretations of such jazz and pop selections as "In the Mood," "Little Rock Getaway," "Brazil," and "Tiger Rag." Several recordings of these shows survive among old-time radio collectors today.

The show also appeared on television a few years later with the same format, but excluding the trio and retitled The Les Paul & Mary Ford Show (aka Les Paul & Mary Ford At Home) with "Vaya Con Dios" as a theme song. Sponsored by Warner–Lambert's Listerine, it was widely syndicated during 1954—55 and was only five minutes long (one or two songs) on film and therefore used as a brief interlude or fill-in on programming schedules. Since Les created the entire show himself, including audio and video, he maintained the original recordings and was in the process of restoring them to up-to-date quality at the time of his death.

== Sources ==
- Jacobson, Bob. Les Paul: Guitar Wizard. Madison, Wisconsin: Wisconsin Historical Society Press, 2012.
- Larkin, Colin, ed. Encyclopedia of Popular Music, 4th ed. Ed. "Les Paul". Oxford Music Online. Oxford University Press. Web. February 22, 2015.
- Shaughnessy, Mary Alice. Les Paul: An American Original. New York: W. Morrow, 1993.
- Wyckoff, Edwin Brit. Electric Guitar Man: The Genius of Les Paul. Genius at work! Berkeley Heights, N.J.: Enslow Publishers, 2008.
