= Mandolino (Les Paul instrumental) =

1954 instrumental single

1954 Capitol 45 single.

"Mandolino" is a 1954 instrumental composed and recorded by guitarist Les Paul. The instrumental was released as a single.

== Background ==
"Mandolino" was composed by Les Paul and was released on Capitol Records as a 7" vinyl 45 single as F2928 45-12972 and published by the Iris-Trojan Music Corporation in New York. The single was also released as a 10" 78 single. The B side was "Whither Thou Goest" featuring Mary Ford on vocals. "Mandolino" reached no. 19 on the Billboard pop singles chart for the week ending on November 17, 1954. The single reached no. 22 on the Cash Box pop singles chart. The single reached no. 33 on the Record World pop singles chart the same year.

Les Paul composed the music. Fred Ebb wrote the lyrics, which were not recorded for the Les Paul release.

The song was also released as part of a Capitol Records four song picture sleeve 45 EP, EAP 1-559, in 1955 under the title "Whither Thou Goest", containing the title track and also "Nola" and "Take Me in Your Arms and Hold Me".

The DeJohn Sisters recorded the song in 1954 with the Fred Ebb lyrics and released it as a 10" 78 rpm single on Epic as 9080.

== Album appearances ==
The song appeared on the 1991 album Les Paul: The Legend and the Legacy on Capitol Records, the 1993 album Les Paul and Mary Ford: The World Is Waiting For the Sunrise on Laserlight, and the 2000 collection Les Paul: Guitar Legends on Disky.

== Sources ==
- Jacobson, Bob. Les Paul: Guitar Wizard. Madison, Wisconsin: Wisconsin Historical Society Press, 2012.
- Shaughnessy, Mary Alice. Les Paul: An American Original. New York: W. Morrow, 1993.
- Wyckoff, Edwin Brit. Electric Guitar Man: The Genius of Les Paul. Genius at work! Berkeley Heights, N.J.: Enslow Publishers, 2008.
