= The Kangaroo (song) =

1953 Capitol 45 single.

1953 UK sheet music, Robert Mellin, Ltd., London.

"The Kangaroo" is a 1953 instrumental written and recorded by Les Paul and released as a single.

== Background ==
Les Paul built the tune upon a rhythm track originally intended for a cover of "Stompin' at the Savoy." Norman Gimbel later wrote lyrics for the tune, which was published by the Deerhaven Music Corporation, Robert Mellin in the UK and originally by Iris-Trojan Music Corporation in the U.S. Although released as an instrumental, Gimbel and Paul share publishing credit on the record label. "The Kangaroo" was released as a Capitol records 7" vinyl 45 single as F2614, Matrix #45-11879. The single was also released as a Capitol 10" shellac 78 single. The flip side was "Don'cha Hear Them Bells". The single reached no. 25 on the Billboard chart and no. 23 on the Cash Box chart in 1953.

== Album appearances ==
The instrumental appeared on the 1991 Capitol Records collection Les Paul: The Legend and the Legacy, and the 2004 compilation Les Paul: Isle of Golden Dreams: The Decca and Capitol Years on Universal Distribution/Universe.
