= Sel-Sync =

Use of tape machine record head as playback head in order to sync with new recording

Sel-Sync or Selective Synchronous recording is the process of selectively using audio tape record heads as playback heads so that new signals can be recorded on other tracks in perfect sync with the existing tracks. Sel-sync recording dramatically changed the recording process, allowing overdubbing of individual recorded tracks.

Sel-sync, along with the multitrack head, was invented by Ross S. Snyder at Ampex in 1955. Three problems had to be solved: mechanical alignment, switching of the record track to playback mode and multitrack erase head. The hard problem was the switching of a track between record and playback mode, as the impedance of record heads is quite different from the impedance of playback heads. Prior to Sel-Sync, record heads were directly wired to the record electronics and playback heads were directly wired to the playback electronics. Also, the designs of the two heads were very different. The problem of switching very low-level and high-impedance circuitry without introducing hum or noise had to be solved. Mort Fujii in the Ampex special projects lab was responsible for the actual design.

Ampex did not patent Sel-Sync because Ross Snyder did not think it would be of interest to more than a few musicians and an Ampex lawyer said the idea was obvious, hence unpatentable. Ampex only trademarked the name. Sel-Sync remained an external, add-on function until the AG-440 and later series, wherein Sel-Sync was integrated into every electronics, although for obvious reasons Sel-Sync is useful only with multi-track machines (more than one track, and, usually, three or more tracks).

D-2 (video) was the first digital recording video tape format to offer Sel-Sync "read before write" (an Ampex term) also known as "preread" on Sony magnetic tape recorders. Read before write allowed simultaneous playback and recording on the same VCR.
