= List of country music guitarists =

This list includes relevant Bluegrass, Rockabilly, Country blues, Country rock, Dobro, Slide Guitar, and Pedal Steel Guitar

- Chet Atkins
- Norman Blake Bluegrass, Traditional Country
- John Bohlinger
- Junior Brown Country
- Tom Brumley Pedal Steel
- Jimmy Bryant
- Roy Buchanan
- James Burton
- Billy Byrd Country
- Jerry Byrd Pedal Steel
- Glen Campbell Country
- Maybelle Carter Bluegrass, Country
- Roy Clark Country
- B.J. Cole Pedal Steel
- Mark O'Connor Bluegrass
- Ry Cooder Bottleneck
- Dan Crary Bluegrass
- Jerry Donahue
- Jerry Douglas Dobro, Bluegrass
- Pete Drake Pedal Steel
- Tommy Emmanuel
- Buddy Emmons Pedal Steel
- Hank Garland Country
- Danny Gatton
- Vince Gill Country
- Merle Haggard
- Roy Harvey Old time music, Bluegrass
- Buddy Holly Rockabilly
- John Jorgenson
- Leo Kottke Acoustic
- Bernie Leadon Country rock
- Albert Lee
- Joe Maphis Country
- Brent Mason
- Leon McAuliffe Western Swing
- Scotty Moore Rockabilly
- Roy Nichols
- Brad Paisley Country
- Les Paul Contemporary, Country
- Carl Perkins Rockabilly
- Luther Perkins Rockabilly
- Riley Puckett Old time music
- Bonnie Raitt Bottleneck
- Will Ray
- Jerry Reed
- Don Reno Bluegrass, Country
- Tony Rice Bluegrass, acoustic
- Don Rich
- Arlen Roth
- Eldon Shamblin Western Swing, Country
- Ricky Skaggs
- Hank Snow Country
- Merle Travis Country
- Travis Tritt Country
- Keith Urban
- Steve Wariner
- Doc Watson Bluegrass, Traditional Country
- Speedy West Pedal Steel
- Clarence White Bluegrass, Country, Country rock
- Bob Wootton Country
