= Rock 'n' Roll Revue =

Rock'n Roll Revue
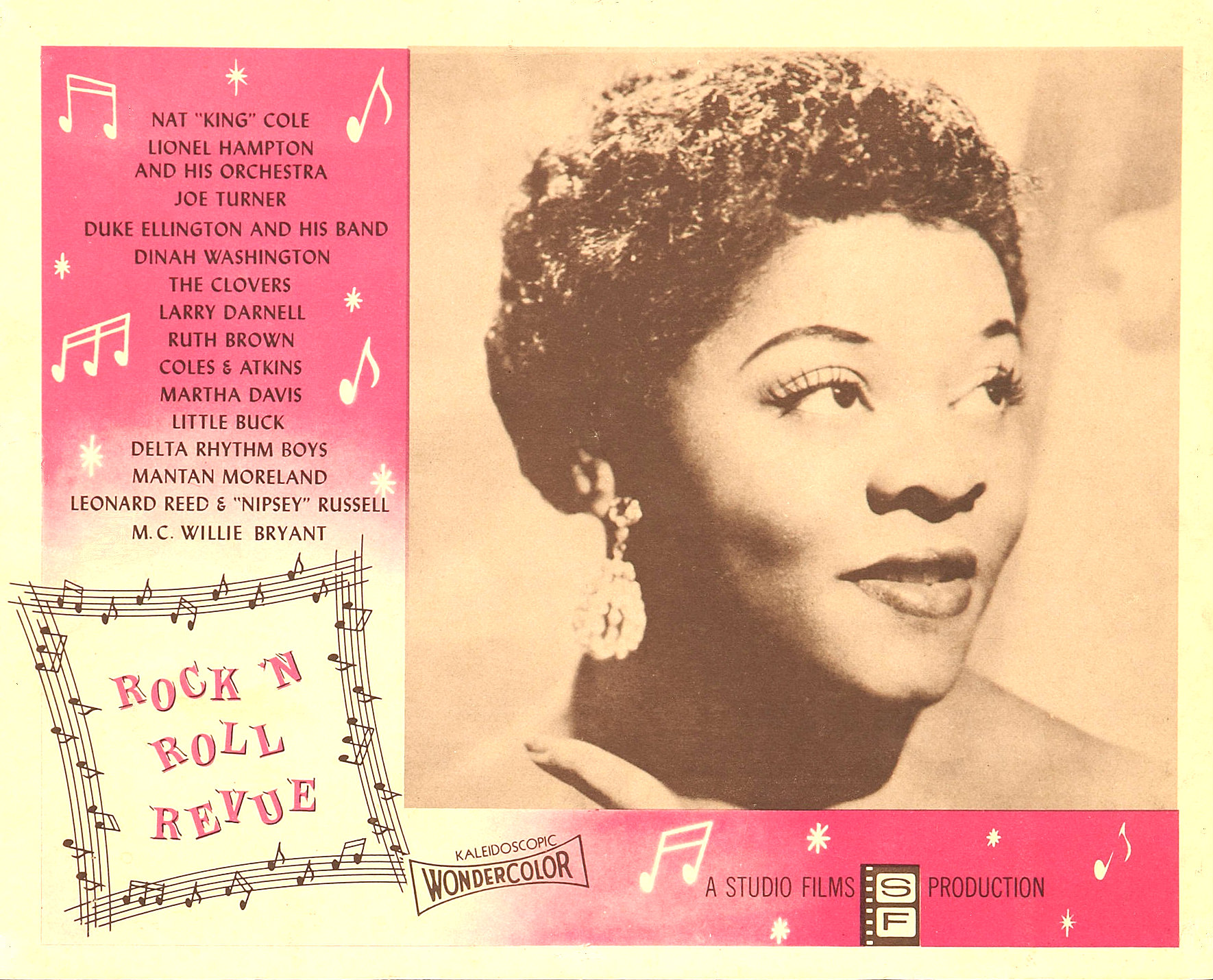
- Lobby card
- Directed by: Joseph Kohn
- Produced by: Ben Frye
- Distributed by: Studio Films, Inc.
- Release date: 1955
- Running time: 69 min.
- Country: United States
- Language: English

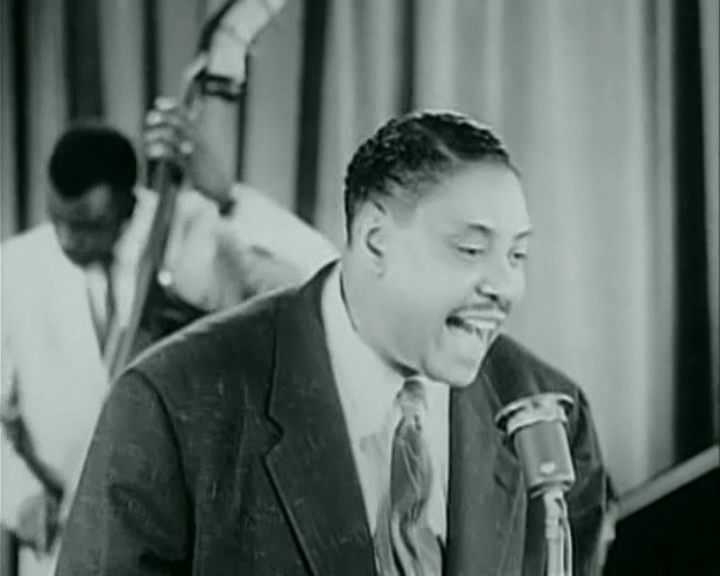
Big Joe Turner

Rock'n Roll Revue is a 1955 American film directed by Joseph Kohn. The film was compiled for theatrical exhibition from the made-for-television short films produced by Snader and Studio Telescriptions, with newly filmed host segments by Willie Bryant.

The film is also known as Harlem Rock 'n' Roll (in the United Kingdom) and Rock and Roll Review (American alternative title).

== Cast ==
- Cholly Atkins as himself
- Louie Bellson as himself
- Delta Rhythm Boys as Themselves
- Ruth Brown as herself
- Willie Bryant as himself - Master of Ceremonies
- The Clovers as Themselves
- Nat "King" Cole as himself
- Charles "Honi" Coles as himself
- Larry Darnell as himself
- Martha Davis as herself
- Duke Ellington as himself
- Lionel Hampton as himself
- Little Buck as himself
- Mantan Moreland as himself
- Leonard Reed as himself
- Nipsey Russell as himself
- Big Joe Turner as himself
- Dinah Washington as herself

== Soundtrack ==
- Duke Ellington and His Orchestra - "The Mooche"
- Big Joe Turner - "Okimoshebop"
- Dinah Washington - "Only a Moment Ago"
- Nat "King" Cole and his trio - "The Trouble With Me Is You"
- Larry Darnell - "What More Do You Want Me to Do"
- The Clovers - "Your Cash Ain't Nothin' But Trash"

== See also ==
- Rhythm and Blues Revue
