= Multitrack recording =

Recording of multiple sources to create a whole

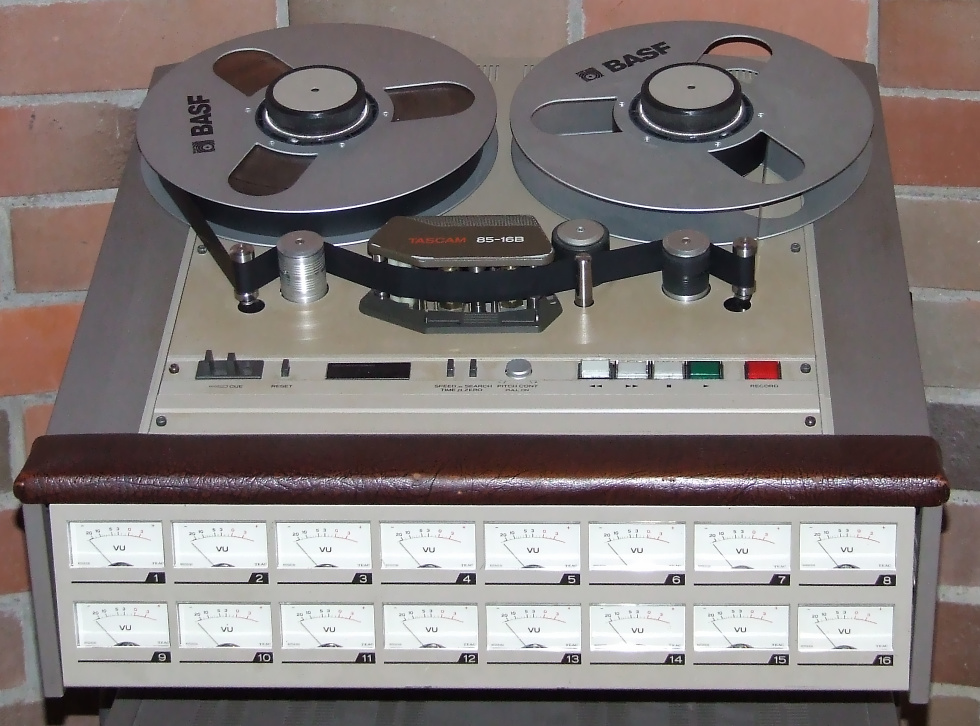
The TASCAM 85 16B analog tape multitrack recorder can record 16 tracks of audio on 1-inch (2.54cm) magnetic tape. Professional analog units of 24 tracks on 2-inch tape were common, with specialty tape heads providing 8, or even 16 tracks on the same tape width (8 tracks for greater fidelity).

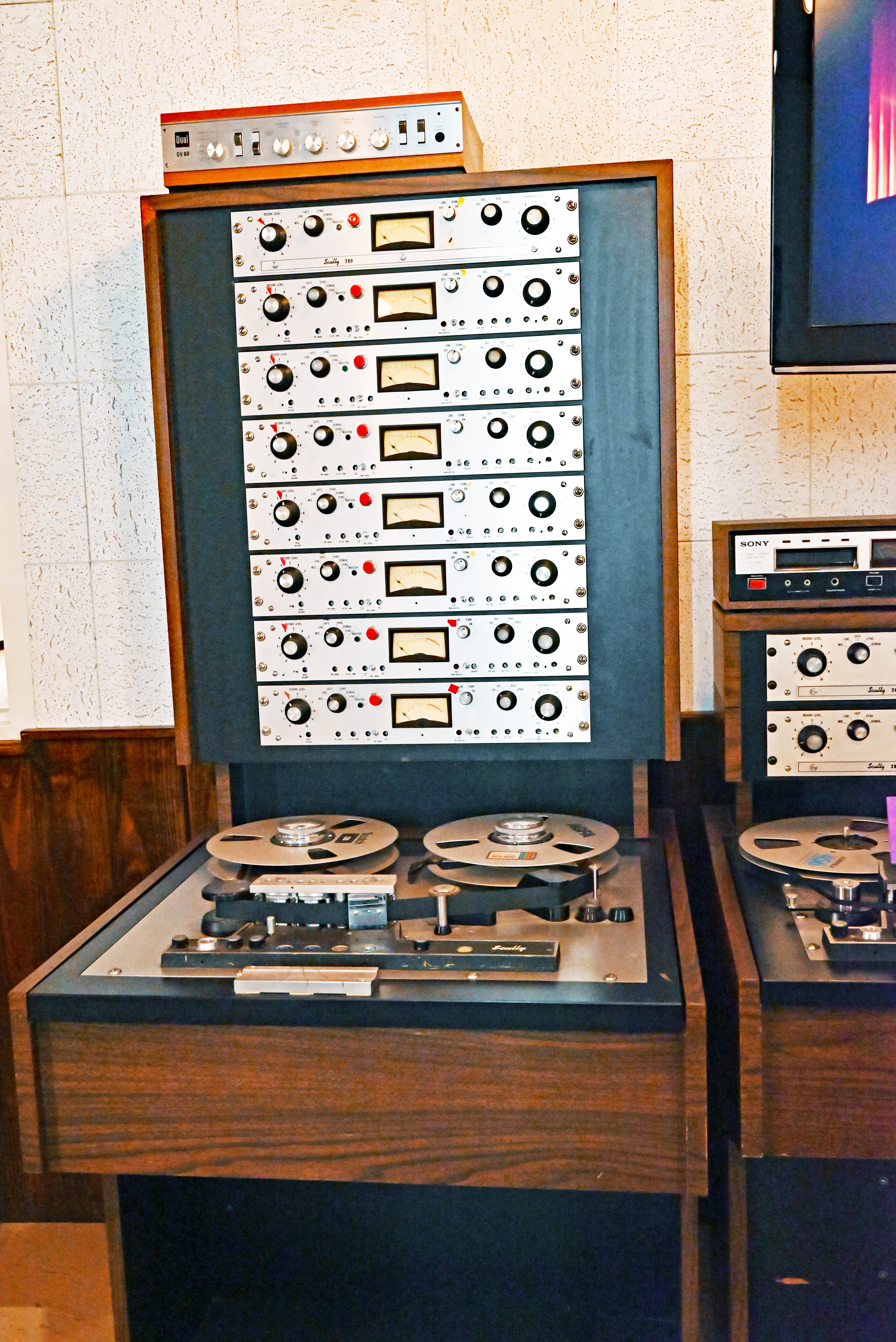
Scully 280 eight-track recorder at the Stax Museum of American Soul Music

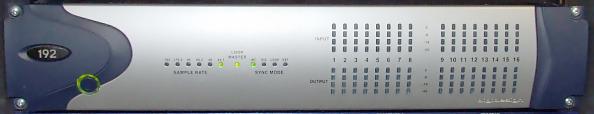
Digital audio interface for the Pro Tools computer-based hard disk multitrack recording system. Digital audio quality is measured in data resolution per channel.

Multitrack recording (MTR), also known as multitracking, is a method of sound recording developed in 1955 that allows for the separate recording of multiple sound sources or of sound sources recorded at different times to create a cohesive whole. Multitracking became possible in the mid-1950s when the idea of simultaneously recording different audio channels to separate discrete tracks on the same reel-to-reel tape was developed. A track was simply a different channel recorded to its own discrete area on the tape whereby their relative sequence of recorded events would be preserved, and playback would be simultaneous or synchronized.

A multitrack recorder allows one or more sound sources to be simultaneously recorded to different tracks, which may subsequently be processed and mixed separately. The singer's microphone, the output of the guitars and keys, and each individual drum in the kit can all be recorded separately using a multitrack recorder. This allows each track to be fine-tuned individually, such as increasing the voice or lowering the chimes, before combining them into the final product.

Prior to the development of multitracking, the sound recording process required all of the singers, band instrumentalists, and/or orchestra accompanists to perform at the same time in the same space. Multitrack recording was a significant technical improvement as it allowed studio engineers to record all of the instruments and vocals for a piece of music separately. Multitracking allowed the engineer to adjust the levels and tone of each individual track, and if necessary, redo certain tracks or overdub parts of the track to correct errors or get a better take. Also, different electronic effects such as reverb could be applied to specific tracks, such as the lead vocals, while not being applied to other tracks where this effect would not be desirable (e.g., on the electric bass). Multitrack recording was much more than a technical innovation; it also enabled record producers and artists to create new sounds that would be impossible to create outside of the studio, such as a lead singer adding many harmony vocals with their own voice to their own lead vocal part, an electric guitar player playing many harmony parts along with their own guitar solo, or even recording the drums and replaying the track backwards for an unusual effect.

In the 1980s and 1990s, computers provided means by which both sound recording and reproduction could be digitized, revolutionizing audio recording and distribution. In the 2000s, multitracking hardware and software for computers was of sufficient quality to be widely used for high-end audio recordings by both professional sound engineers and by bands recording without studios using widely available programs, which can be used on a high-end laptop computer. Though magnetic tape has not been replaced as a recording medium, the advantages of non-linear editing (NLE) and recording have resulted in digital systems largely superseding tape. Even in the 2010s, with digital multitracking being the dominant technology, the original word track is still used by audio engineers.

== Process ==
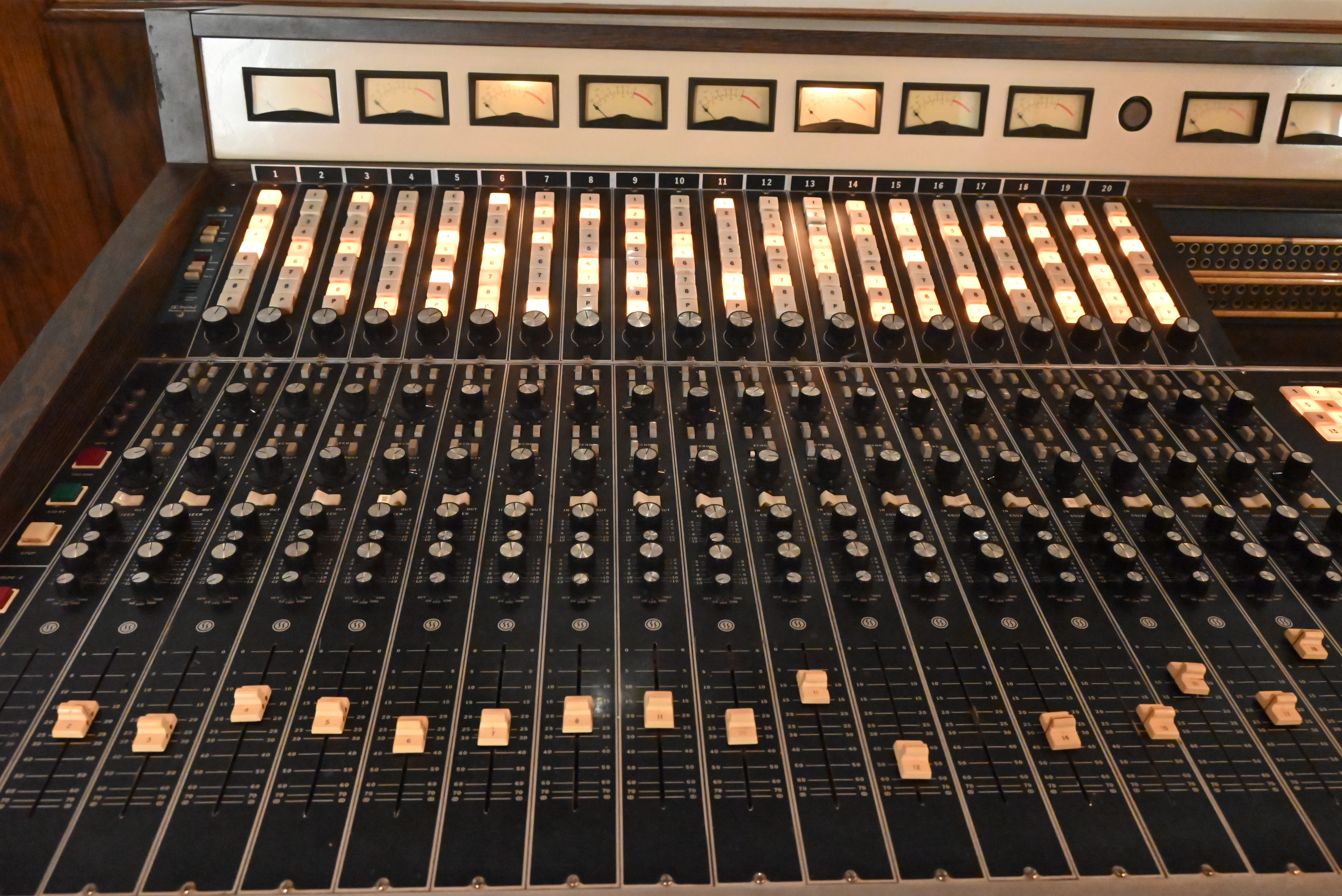
Mixing desk with twenty inputs and eight outputs

Multitracking can be achieved with analogue recording, tape-based equipment (from simple, late-1970s cassette-based four-track Portastudios, to eight-track cassette machines, to 2" reel-to-reel 24-track machines), digital equipment that relies on tape storage of recorded digital data (such as ADAT eight-track machines) and hard disk-based systems often employing a computer and audio recording software. Multi-track recording devices vary in their specifications, such as the number of simultaneous tracks available for recording at any one time; in the case of tape-based systems, this is limited by, among other factors, the physical size of the tape employed.

With the introduction of SMPTE timecode in the early 1970s, engineers began to use computers to perfectly synchronize separate audio and video playback, or multiple audio tape machines. In this system, one track of each machine carried the timecode synchronization signal. Over the years, the industry transitioned from 16-track to 24-track recording on 2-inch tape to twin 24-tracks for 48-track recording (up to 46 audio tracks). An extreme example of this occurred in 1982, when the rock group Toto recorded parts of Toto IV on three synchronized 24-track machines. This setup allowed for 66 audio tracks, using track 24 of each machine for time code, and leaving track 23 unused to prevent interference with the audio.

In the late 1970s and 1980s, digital multitrack tape machines emerged, including the 3M and Mitsubishi X-800 32-track machines, and Sony DASH PCM-3324 and later the PCM-3348 machines, which allowed greater flexibility with more available tracks for recording. As well, in order to mix using automation on the console, analogue recorders generally required adjacent tracks to the time code track to be kept blank to avoid the time code signal interfering with the audio signals, which limited available tracks to 22 or 23 track at most. Digital multitrack machines had time code inserted elsewhere on the tape, and thus did not require allocating it to an audio track, which meant all tracks were available for recording. What's more, in the case of the PCM-3348, which doubled the number of tracks from the PCM-3324, both machines could use the same ½” digital tape, and also a 24-track reel first recorded on a PCM-3324 was able to be used on a PCM-3348 and have another 24 tracks overdubbed.

For computer-based systems, the trend in the 2000s is towards unlimited numbers of record/playback tracks, although issues such as RAM memory and CPU available do limit this from machine to machine. Moreover, on computer-based systems, the number of simultaneously available recording tracks is limited by the number of sound card discrete analog or digital inputs.

When recording, audio engineers can select which track (or tracks) on the device will be used for each instrument, voice, or other input and can even blend one track with two instruments to vary the music and sound options available. At any given point on the tape, any of the tracks on the recording device can be recording or playing back using sel-sync or Selective Synchronous recording. This allows an artist to be able to record onto track 2 and, simultaneously, listen to tracks 1, 3 and 7, allowing them to sing or to play an accompaniment to the performance already recorded on these tracks. They might then record an alternate version on track 4 while listening to the other tracks. All the tracks can then be played back in perfect synchrony, as if they had originally been played and recorded together. This can be repeated until all of the available tracks have been used, or in some cases, reused. During mixdown, a separate set of playback heads with higher fidelity are used.

Before all tracks are filled, any number of existing tracks can be bounced into one or two tracks, and the original tracks erased, making more room for more tracks to be reused for fresh recording. In 1963, the Beatles were using twin track for Please Please Me. The Beatles' producer George Martin used this technique extensively to achieve multiple-track results, while still being limited to using only multiple four-track machines, until an eight-track machine became available during the recording of the Beatles' self-titled ninth album. The Beach Boys' Pet Sounds also made innovative use of multitracking with eight-track machines of the day (circa 1965). Motown also began recording with eight-track machines in 1965, before moving to 16-track machines in mid-1969.

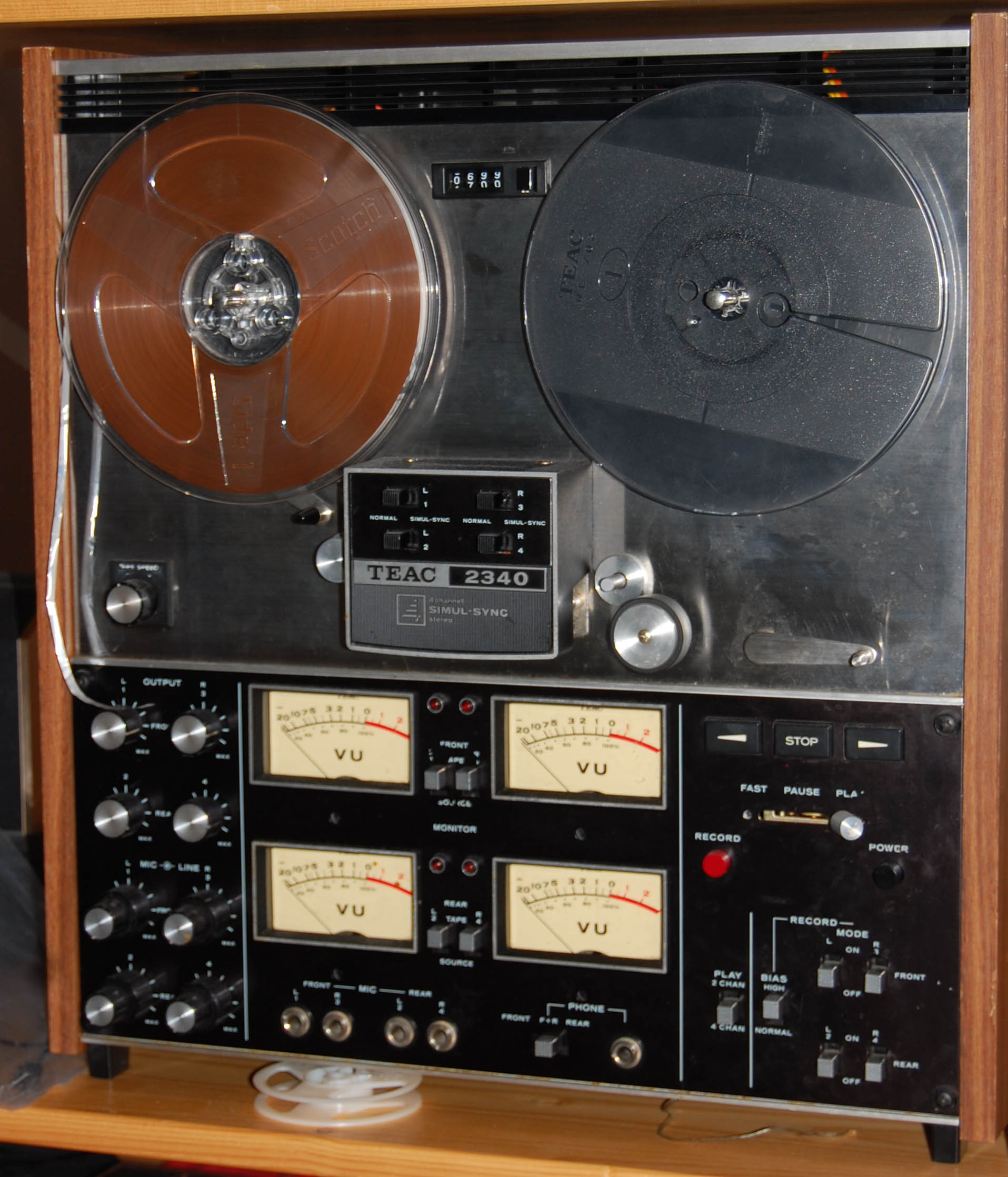
The TEAC 2340, a popular early (1973) home multitrack recorder, four tracks on ¼ inch tape

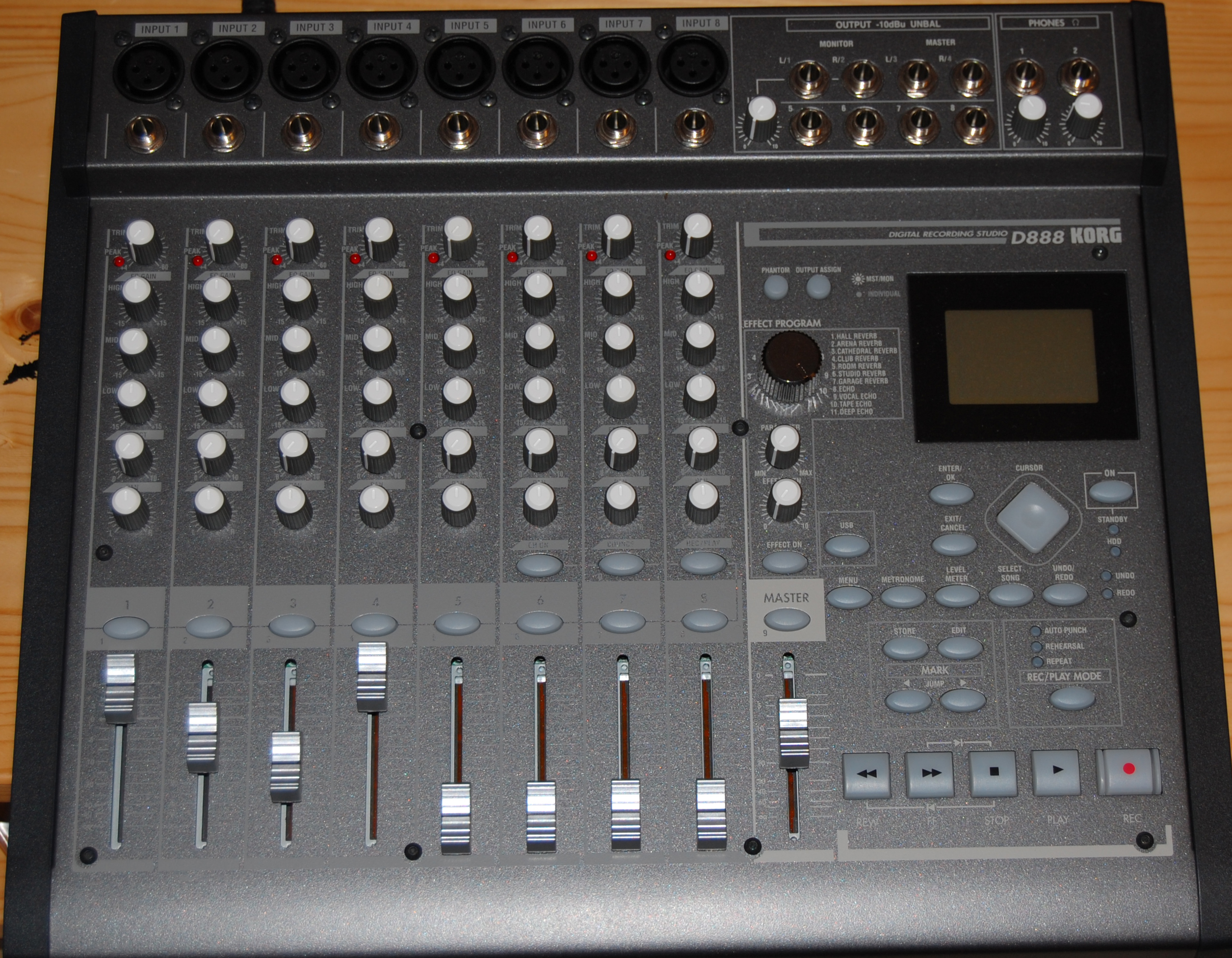
Korg D888 eight-track digital recorder

Multitrack recording also allows any recording artist to record multiple takes of any given section of their performance, allowing them to refine their performance to virtual perfection by making additional takes of songs or instrumental tracks. A recording engineer can record only the section being worked on, without erasing any other section of that track. This process of turning the recording mechanism on and off is called punching in and punching out.

When recording is completed, the many tracks are mixed down through a mixing console to a two-track stereo recorder in a format which can then be duplicated and distributed. (Movie and DVD soundtracks can be mixed down to four or more tracks, as needed, the most common being five tracks, with an additional low-frequency effects track, hence the 5.1 surround sound most commonly available on DVDs.)

Most of the records, CDs and cassettes commercially available in a music store are recordings that were originally recorded on multiple tracks, and then mixed down to stereo. In some rare cases, as when an older song is technically updated, these stereo (or mono) mixes can in turn be recorded (as if it were a submix) onto two (or one) tracks of a multitrack recorder, allowing additional sound (tracks) to be layered on the remaining tracks.

== Flexibility ==
During multitracking, multiple musical instruments (and vocals) can be recorded, either one at a time or simultaneously, onto individual tracks, so that the sounds thus recorded can be accessed, processed and manipulated individually to produce the desired results. In the 2010s, many rock and pop bands recorded each part of the song one after the other. First, the bass and drums are often recorded, followed by the chordal rhythm section instruments. Then the lead vocals and guitar solos are added. As a last step, the harmony vocals are added. On the other hand, orchestras are always recorded with all 70 to 100 instrumentalists playing their parts simultaneously. If each group of instruments has its own microphone, and each instrument with a solo melody has its own microphone, the different microphones can record on multiple tracks simultaneously. After recording the orchestra, the record producer and conductor can adjust the balance and tone of the different instrument sections and solo instruments, because each section and solo instrument was recorded to its own track.

With the rock or pop band example, after recording some parts of a song, an artist might listen to only the guitar part by muting all the tracks except the one on which the guitar was recorded. If one then wanted to listen to the lead vocals in isolation, one would do so by muting all the tracks apart from the lead vocals track. If one wanted to listen to the entire song, one could do so by unmuting all the tracks. If one did not like the guitar part, or found a mistake in it, and wanted to replace it, one could do so by re-recording only the guitar part (i.e., re-recording only the track on which the guitar was recorded), rather than re-recording the entire song.

If all the voices and instruments in a recording are individually recorded on distinct tracks, then the artist is able to retain complete control over the final sculpting of the song during the mix-down (re-recording to two stereo tracks for mass distribution) phase. For example, if an artist wanted to apply one effects unit to a synthesizer part, a different effect to a guitar part, a chorused reverb effect to the lead vocals, and different effects to all the drums and percussion instruments, they could not do so if they had all been originally recorded together onto the same track. However, if they had been recorded onto separate tracks, then the artist could blend and alter all of the instrument and vocal sounds with complete freedom.

Multitracking a song also leaves open the possibilities of remixes by the same or future artists, such as DJs. If the song was not available in a multitrack format recording, the job of the remixing artist was very difficult, or impossible, because, once the tracks had been re-recorded together onto a single track ('mixed down'), they were previously considered inseparable. More recent software allows sound source separation, whereby individual instruments, voices and effects can be upmixed — isolated from a single-track source — in high quality. This has permitted the production of stereophonic or surround sound mixes of recordings that were originally mastered and released in mono.

== History ==
The process was conceived and developed by Ross Snyder at Ampex in 1955, resulting in the first Sel-Sync machine, an 8-track machine which used one-inch tape. This 8-track recorder was sold to the American guitarist, songwriter, luthier, and inventor Les Paul for $10,000. It became known as the Octopus. Les Paul, Mary Ford and Patti Page used the technology in the late 1950s to enhance vocals and instruments. From these beginnings, it evolved in subsequent decades into a mainstream recording technique.

Professional multitrack analog audio tape manufacturers included Ampex, EMI, MCI, Otari, Scully, Soundcraft, Stephens, Studer, TASCAM, 3M (Mincom division).

== With computers ==
Since the early 1990s, many performers have recorded music using only a Mac or PC equipped with multitrack recording software as a tracking machine. The computer must have a sound card or other type of audio interface with one or more analog-to-digital converters. Microphones are needed to record the sounds of vocalists or acoustic instruments. Depending on the capabilities of the system, some instruments, such as a synthesizer or electric guitar, can also be sent to an interface directly using line level or MIDI inputs. Direct inputs eliminate the need for microphones and can provide another range of sound control options.

There are tremendous differences in computer audio interfaces. Such units vary widely in price, sound quality, and flexibility. The most basic interfaces use audio circuitry that is built into the computer motherboard. The most sophisticated audio interfaces are external units of professional studio quality, which can cost thousands of dollars. Professional interfaces usually use one or more IEEE 1394 (commonly known as FireWire) connections. Other types of interfaces may use internal PCI cards, or external USB connections. Popular manufacturers of high-quality interfaces include Apogee Electronics, Avid Audio (formerly Digidesign), Echo Digital Audio, Focusrite, Solid State Logic, MOTU, RME Audio, M-Audio and PreSonus.

Microphones are often designed for highly specific applications and have a major effect on recording quality. A single studio-quality microphone can cost $5,000 or more, while consumer-quality recording microphones can be bought for less than $50 each. Microphones also need some type of microphone preamplifier to prepare the signal for use by other equipment. These preamplifiers can also have a major effect on the sound and come in different price ranges, physical configurations, and capability levels. Microphone preamplifiers may be external units or a built-in feature of other audio equipment.

=== Software ===
Software for multitrack recording can record multiple tracks at once. It generally uses graphic notation for an interface and offers a number of views of the music. Most multitrackers also provide audio playback capability. Some multitrack software also provides MIDI playback functions not just for audio; during playback, the MIDI data is sent to a softsynth or virtual instrument (e.g., VSTi) which converts the data to audio sound. Multitrack software may also provide other features that qualify it as a digital audio workstation (DAW). These features may include various displays, including showing the score of the music, as well as editing capability. There is often overlap between many of the categories of musical software. In this case, scorewriters and full-featured multitrackers such as DAWs have similar features for playback but may have less similarity for editing and recording.

Multitrack recording software varies widely in price and capability. Popular multitrack recording software programs include: Reason, Ableton Live, FL Studio, Adobe Audition, Pro Tools, Digital Performer, Cakewalk Sonar, Samplitude, Nuendo, Cubase and Logic. Lower-cost alternatives include Mixcraft, REAPER and n-Track Studio. Open-source and free software programs are also available for multitrack recording. These range from very basic programs such as Jokosher to Ardour and Audacity, which are capable of performing many functions of the most sophisticated programs.

Instruments and voices are usually recorded as individual files on a computer hard drive. These function as tracks which can be added, removed or processed in many ways. Effects such as reverb, chorus, and delays can be applied by electronic devices or by computer software. Such effects are used to shape the sound as desired by the producer. When the producer is satisfied with the recorded sound, finished tracks can be mixed into a new stereo pair of tracks within the multitrack recording software. Finally, the final stereo recording can be written to a CD, which can be copied and distributed.

== Order of recording ==
In modern popular songs, drums, percussion instruments and electric bass are often among the first instruments to be recorded. These are the core instruments of the rhythm section. Musicians recording later tracks use the precise attack of the drum sounds as a rhythmic guide. In some styles, the drums may be recorded for a few bars and then looped. Click (metronome) tracks are also often used as the first sound to be recorded, especially when the drummer is not available for the initial recording, and/or the final mix will be synchronized with motion picture and/or video images. One reason that a band may start with just the drums is that this allows the band to pick the song's key later on. The producer and the musicians can experiment with the song's key and arrangement against the basic rhythm track. Also, though the drums might eventually be mixed down to a couple of tracks, each individual drum and percussion instrument might be initially recorded to its own individual track. The drums and percussion combined can occupy a large number of tracks utilized in a recording. This is done so that each percussion instrument can be processed individually for maximum effect. Equalization is often used on individual drums to bring out each one's characteristic sound. The last tracks recorded are often the vocals (though a temporary vocal track may be recorded early on, either as a reference or to guide subsequent musicians; this is sometimes called a guide vocal, ghost vocal or scratch vocal). One reason for this is that singers will often temper their vocal expression in accordance with the accompaniment. Producers and songwriters can also use the guide/scratch vocal when they have not quite ironed out all the lyrics or for flexibility based on who sings the lead vocal (as The Alan Parsons Project's Eric Woolfson often did).

== Concert music ==
For classical and jazz recordings, particularly instrumentals where multitracking is chosen as the recording method (as opposed to direct to stereo, for example), a different arrangement is used; all tracks are recorded simultaneously. Sound barriers are often placed between different groups within the orchestra, e.g. pianists, violinists, percussionists, etc. When barriers are used, these groups listen to each other via headphones.

Multitrack live recording is similar to gigging – planning ahead of time, equipment to carry and set up, waiting, and then activity over the next 40 minutes or so. There is little doubt that a pseudolive studio performance may enhance certain forms of music, particularly those with intensity in the live performance, it lacks the atmosphere of a live performance. You may record the moment with a portable setup during the performance. You can produce live recordings with just two microphones and a building's acoustics, but that will have to wait for another day. Taking a feed from the front of house (or FOH) desk directly to tape or DAT is another technique of live recording, although this will only work in large venues where everything is run through the PA system. Even so, a backline will result in less guitar and bass being routed via the main PA system, resulting in an unbalanced mix. A multitrack recording has advantages: it allows you better control after the event because you may fine-tune the mix and correct mistakes without sacrificing the characteristics of a live performance. It does, however, necessitate additional pre-gig planning and equipment.

== See also ==
- Click track
- Comparison of digital audio editors
- Digital audio workstation
- Dynamic range compression
- Fostex
- List of musical works released in a stem format
- MIDI mockup
- Module file
- Overdubbing
- Portastudio
- Surround sound
- Quadraphonic sound
- Remix
- Reverb
- Sound effects#Techniques
- TASCAM
- Revox
