= Bouquet of Roses (album) =

Studio album by Les Paul, Mary Ford
- Released: 1962
- Genre: Country
- Label: Columbia
- Producer: Jim Fogelsong

Les Paul, Mary Ford chronology
Lover's Luau (1959)	Bouquet of Roses (1962)	Warm and Wonderful (1962)

Professional ratings
Review scores
Source	Rating
AllMusic	1.5/5 stars

Bouquet of Roses is an album by Les Paul and Mary Ford, released in 1962.

== Track listing ==
1. "I Love You So Much It Hurts Me"
2. "You Win Again"
3. "Four Walls"
4. "I Hang My Head and Cry"
5. "Someday (You'll Want Me to Want You)"
6. "I'll Never Be Free" (Bennie Benjamin/George Weiss)
7. "I Gotta Have My Baby Back"
8. "I'm Thinking Tonight of My Blue Eyes"
9. "End of the World"
10. "You're Free to Go"
11. "Bouquet of Roses"
12. "She'll Have to Go"
