= Rhythm and Blues Revue =

- Directed by: Joseph Kohn
- Written by: Ben Frye; Leonard Reed
- Produced by: Ben Frye
- Starring: See below
- Cinematography: Don Malkames
- Edited by: Arthur Rosenblum
- Distributed by: Studio Films, Inc.
- Release date: 1955
- Running time: 86/71 minutes
- Country: United States
- Language: English

Rhythm and Blues Revue is a 1955 American concert film directed by Joseph Kohn and Leonard Reed.

== Summary ==
Rhythm and Blues Revue is a plotless variety show, one of several compiled for theatrical exhibition from the made-for-television short films produced by Snader and Studio Telescriptions, with newly filmed host segments by Willie Bryant. Originally 86 minutes, the "short" version available on public domain collections and websites is missing a reel.

Producer Ben Frye also released the film Harlem Rock 'n' Roll the year prior.

== Cast ==
- Lionel Hampton
- Faye Adams
- Bill Bailey
- Herb Jeffries
- Freddie & Flo (Freddie Lucas and Florence Hill)
- Amos Milburn
- The Larks (David Bowers, Orville Brooks and Gene Mumford)
- Sarah Vaughan
- Count Basie
- Big Joe Turner
- Delta Rhythm Boys
- Martha Davis
- Little Buck
- Nat King Cole
- Mantan Moreland
- Nipsey Russell
- Cab Calloway
- Ruth Brown
- Willie Bryant

== Soundtrack ==
- Amos Milburn - "Bad Bad Whiskey"
- Bill Bailey (dancing) - "The World Is Waiting For The Sunrise"
- The Larks - "The World Is Waiting For The Sunrise"
- Nat King Cole - "Calypso Blues"
- Delta Rhythm Boys - "Dry Bones"
- Faye Adams - "Every Day"
- Martha Davis & Her Spouse - "Goodbye Honey, Goodbye"
- Count Basie Combo - "Basie's Conversation", "One O'Clock Jump
- Ruth Brown - "It's Raining Teardrops From My Eyes"
- Lionel Hampton And His Orchestra - "Vibe Boogie", "Bongo Interlude"
- Cab Calloway And His Orchestra - "Minnie the Moocher"
- Sarah Vaughan - "Perdido"
- Big Joe Turner - "Shake, Rattle and Roll"
- Herb Jeffries - "In My Heart (There's a Song)"

== See also ==
- Rock 'n' Roll Revue
