= Les Paul =

American guitarist, songwriter and inventor (1915–2009)

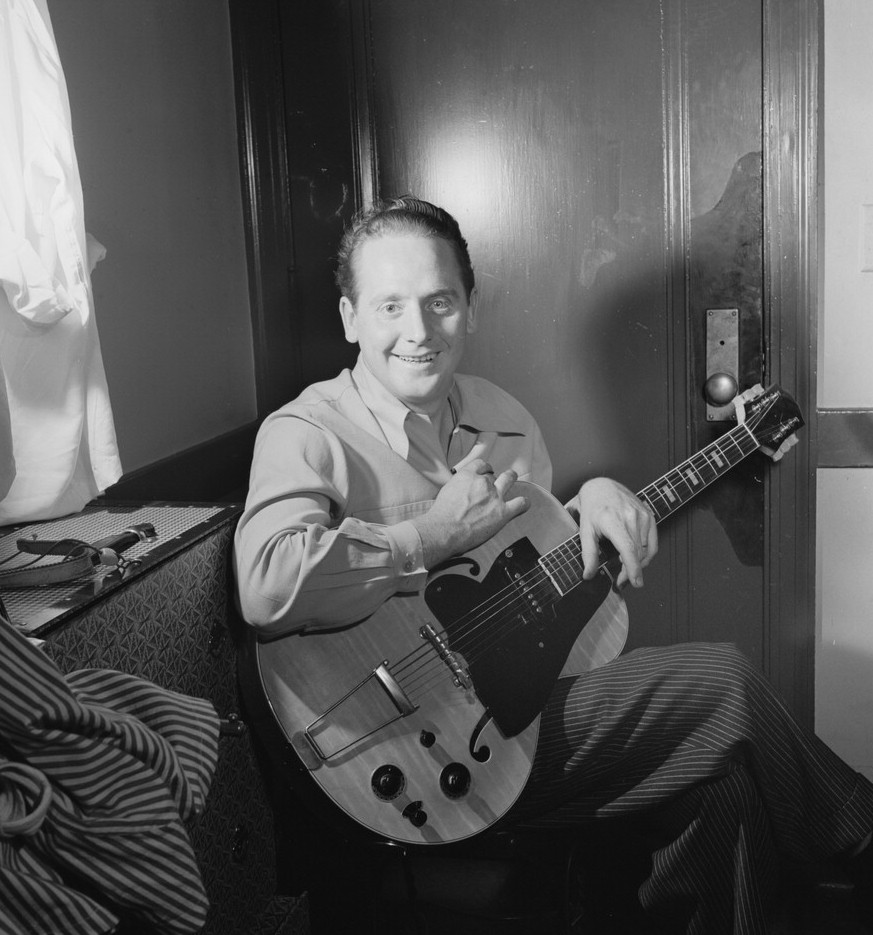
- Paul in c. January 1947

Background information
- Born: Lester William Polsfuss; June 9, 1915; Waukesha, Wisconsin, U.S.
- Died: August 12, 2009 (aged 94) White Plains, New York, U.S.
- Genres: Jazz; country; blues; rock and roll; acoustic
- Occupations: Musician; songwriter; inventor; luthier
- Instruments: Vocals; guitar; piano; harmonica
- Years active: 1928–2009
- Labels: Capitol; Columbia; RCA Victor; Decca
- Formerly of: Les Paul and Mary Ford
- Spouses: Virginia Webb (m. 1937; div. 1949); Mary Ford (m. 1949; div. 1964)
- Website: www.les-paul.com

Lester William Polsfuss (June 9, 1915 – August 12, 2009), known as Les Paul, was an American jazz, country, and blues guitarist, songwriter, luthier, and inventor. He was one of the pioneers of the solid-body electric guitar, and his prototype, called the Log, served as inspiration for the Gibson Les Paul. Paul taught himself how to play guitar, and while he is mainly known for jazz and popular music, he had an early career in country music. In the 1950s, he and his wife, singer and guitarist Mary Ford, made numerous recordings, selling millions of copies.

Paul is credited with many recording innovations. His early experiments with overdubbing (also known as sound on sound), delay effects such as tape delay, phasing, and multitrack recording were among the first to attract widespread attention. His licks, trills, chording sequences, fretting techniques, and timing set him apart from his contemporaries and inspired many guitarists of the present day.

Among his many honors, Paul is one of a handful of artists with a permanent exhibit in the Rock and Roll Hall of Fame. He is prominently named by the music museum on its website as an "architect" and a "key inductee" with Sam Phillips and Alan Freed. Paul is the only inductee in both the Rock and Roll Hall of Fame and the National Inventors Hall of Fame.

== Early life ==
Paul was born Lester William Polsfuss in Waukesha, Wisconsin, to George and Evelyn (Stutz) Polsfuss, both of German ancestry. Paul's mother was related to the founders of Milwaukee's Valentin Blatz Brewing Company, and to the makers of Stutz automobiles. His parents divorced when he was a child. His mother simplified their Prussian family name first to Polfuss, then to Polfus, although Les Paul never legally changed his name. Before taking the stage name Les Paul, he performed as Red Hot Red and Rhubarb Red.

At the age of eight, Paul began playing the harmonica. After learning the piano, he switched to the banjo and guitar. During this time, Paul invented a neck-worn harmonica holder that allowed hands-free switching from one side of a double-sided harmonica to the other. His design is still widely manufactured today. By age thirteen, Paul was performing semi-professionally as a country-music singer, guitarist, and harmonica player. While playing at Waukesha-area drive-ins and roadhouses, Paul made his first experiments in attaching electric amplification directly to instruments (as opposed to playing them near a microphone) and in modifying the instruments themselves. Wanting to make his acoustic guitar heard by more people at local venues, he wired a phonograph needle to his guitar and connected it to a radio speaker. As a teen Paul experimented with sustain effects, and built a guitar-like instrument using a 2-foot piece of rail from a nearby train line as the body. At age seventeen, Paul played with Rube Tronson's Texas Cowboys, and soon after that he dropped out of high school to team up with Sunny Joe Wolverton's Radio Band in St. Louis, Missouri, who played regularly on KMOX.

== Career ==
=== Early career ===
Paul and Wolverton moved to Chicago in 1934, where they continued to perform country music on radio station WBBM and at the 1934 Chicago World's Fair. While in Chicago, Paul learned jazz from the great performers on Chicago's Southside. During the day, he played country music as Rhubarb Red on the radio. At night, he was Les Paul, playing jazz. He met pianist Art Tatum, whose playing influenced him to continue with the guitar rather than play jazz on the piano. His first two records were released in 1936, credited to "Rhubarb Red", Paul's hillbilly alter ego. He also served as an accompanist for other bands signed to Decca. During this time, he began adding different sounds and adopted his stage name of Les Paul.

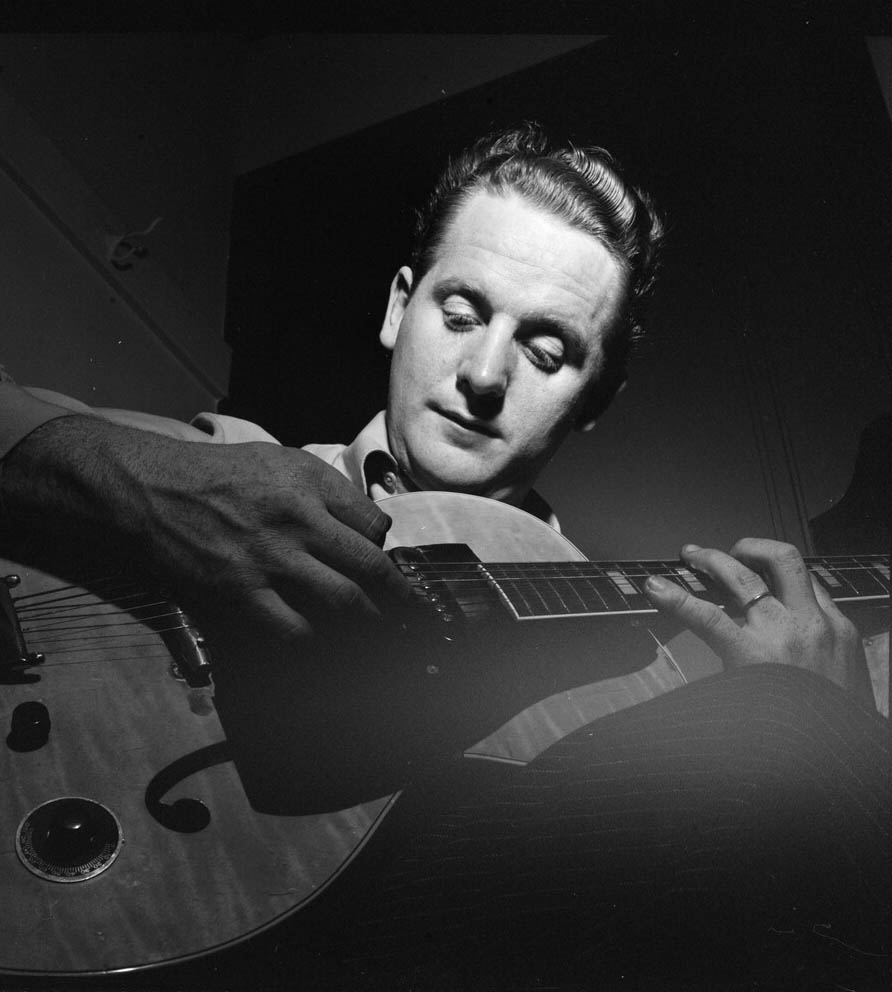
Les Paul playing live, c. 1947

Paul's guitar style was strongly influenced by the music of Django Reinhardt, whom he greatly admired. Following World War II, Paul sought out and made friends with Reinhardt. When Reinhardt died in 1953, Paul paid for part of the funeral's cost. One of Paul's prized possessions was a Selmer acoustic guitar given to him by Reinhardt's widow.

Paul formed a trio in 1937 with rhythm guitarist Jim Atkins (older half-brother of guitarist Chet Atkins) and bassist/percussionist Ernie "Darius" Newton. They left Chicago for New York in 1938, landing a featured spot with Fred Waring's radio show. Chet Atkins later wrote that his brother, home on a family visit, presented him with an expensive Gibson archtop guitar that Les Paul had given to Jim. Chet recalled that it was the first professional-quality instrument he ever owned.

While jamming in his apartment basement in 1941, Paul suffered an electric shock and nearly died. During two years of recuperation, he moved to Chicago where he was the music director for radio stations WJJD and WIND. In 1943, he moved to Hollywood where he performed on radio and formed a new trio.

He was drafted into the U.S. Army in 1943, where he served in the Armed Forces Radio Network, backing such artists as Bing Crosby and the Andrews Sisters, and performing in his own right.

As a last-minute replacement for Oscar Moore, Paul played with Nat King Cole and other artists in the inaugural Jazz at the Philharmonic concert in Los Angeles, California, on July 2, 1944. His solo on "Body and Soul" is a demonstration of his admiration for and emulation of Django Reinhardt, as well as his development of original lines.

Also that year, Paul's trio appeared on Bing Crosby's radio show. Crosby sponsored Paul's recordings. They recorded together several times, including "It's Been a Long, Long Time", which was a No. 1 hit in 1945. Paul recorded several albums for Decca in the 1940s. The Andrews Sisters hired his trio to open for them during a tour in 1946. Their manager, Lou Levy, said watching Paul's fingers while he played guitar was like watching a train go by. Their conductor, Vic Schoen, said his playing was always original. Maxine Andrews said, "He'd tune into the passages we were singing and lightly play the melody, sometimes in harmony. We'd sing these fancy licks and he'd keep up with us note for note in exactly the same rhythm... almost contributing a fourth voice. But he never once took the attention away from what we were doing. He did everything he could to make us sound better." In the 1950s, when he recorded Mary Ford's vocals on multiple tracks, he created music that sounded like the Andrews Sisters.

In January 1948, Paul shattered his right arm and elbow among multiple injuries in a near-fatal automobile accident on an icy Route 66 west of Davenport, Oklahoma. Mary Ford was driving the Buick convertible, which plunged off the side of a railroad overpass and dropped twenty feet into a ravine. They were returning from Wisconsin to Los Angeles after visiting family. Doctors at Oklahoma City's Wesley Hospital told Paul that they could not rebuild his elbow. Their other option was amputation. Paul was flown to Los Angeles, where his arm was set at an angle—just over 90 degrees—that allowed him to cradle and pick the guitar. It took him nearly a year and a half to recover.

=== Guitar builder ===
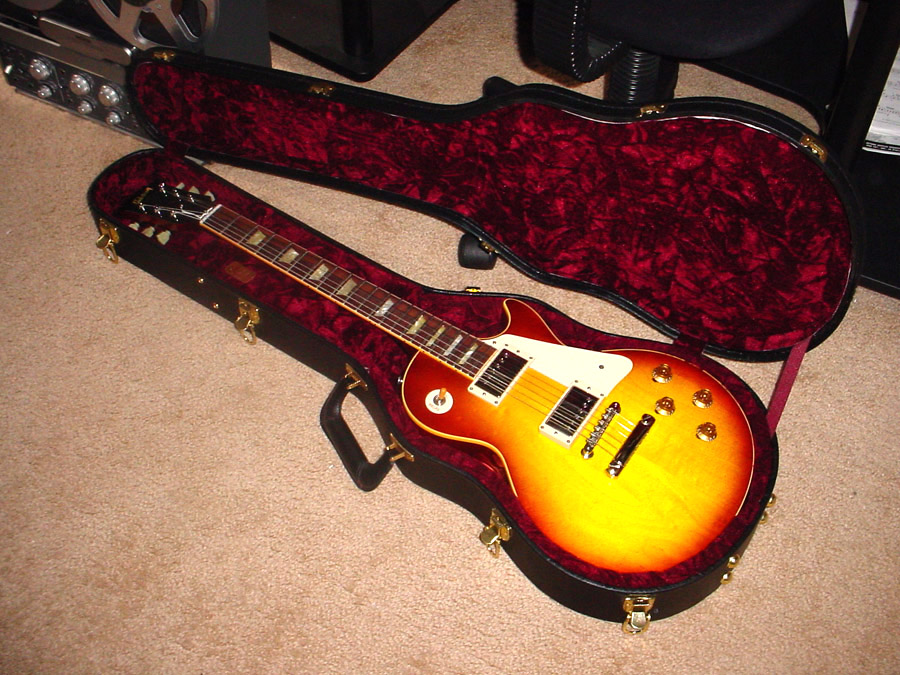
Gibson '58 Reissue Les Paul guitar (2005)

In 1940, Les Paul revisited his experiments with the train rail. This time he created a similar prototype instrument, a one-off solid-body electric guitar known as "The Log", which was manufactured utilizing a common construction material often referred to as a "4×4 stud post", which provided a unique neck-thru design. The "stud post" (a 4″ × 4″ section of Douglas fir) was then equipped with a crude bridge and an electromagnetic pickup, neck and strings. The Log was constructed by Paul after-hours in the New York City Epiphone guitar factory, and is one of the first solid-body electric guitars. For the sake of appearance, he attached the body of an Epiphone hollow-body guitar sawn lengthwise with The Log in the middle. This solved his two main problems: feedback, as the acoustic body no longer resonated with the amplified sound, and sustain, as the energy of the strings was not dissipated in generating sound through the guitar body. These instruments were constantly being improved and modified over the years, and Paul continued to use them in his recordings even after the development of his eponymous Gibson model.

Paul approached the Gibson Guitar Corporation with his idea of a solid-body electric guitar in 1941, but Gibson showed no interest until Fender began marketing its Esquire and Broadcaster guitars in 1950 (the Broadcaster was renamed the Telecaster in 1951 because of a trademark conflict with Gretsch, which sold the Broadkaster line of drums).

Gibson's Ted McCarty was the chief designer of the guitar, which was based on Paul's drawings and later dubbed the Gibson Les Paul. Gibson entered into a promotional and financial arrangement with Les Paul, paying him a royalty on sales. The guitar went on sale in 1952. Paul continued to make design suggestions.

In 1960, sales of the original Les Paul model had dropped, so a more modernistic model was introduced (today called the Gibson SG), but then still bearing the Les Paul name. Not liking the new look, and concerned about severe lack of strength of the body and neck, Paul was dissatisfied with this new Gibson guitar. This, and a pending divorce from Mary Ford, led to Paul ending his endorsement and use of his name on Gibson guitars from 1964 until 1966, by which time his divorce was completed.

Paul continued to suggest technical improvements, although they were not always successful commercially. In 1962, Paul was issued U.S. patent 3,018,680, for a pickup in which the coil was integrated into the bridge. In the mid-1940s, he introduced an aluminum guitar with the tuning mechanisms below the bridge. As it had no headstock, and the string attachments were at the nut, it was the first headless guitar. Unfortunately, Paul's guitar was so sensitive to the heat from stage lights that it would not keep tune. However, he used it for several of his hit recordings. This style was further developed by others, most successfully Ned Steinberger.

=== Multitrack recording ===
Paul first experimented with sound on sound while in elementary school when he punched holes in the piano roll for his mother's player piano. In 1946, his mother complimented him on a song she had heard on the radio, when in fact she had heard George Barnes, not Paul. This motivated Paul to spend two years in his Hollywood garage recording studio, creating his unique sound, his New Sound. Paul stunned the music industry with his New Sound in 1948.

Paul played in Bing Crosby's back-up band for a number of years and recorded several songs with, most notably "It's Been a Long, Long Time," which was a number-one single in 1945.

After a recording session, Bing Crosby suggested that Paul build a recording studio so he could produce the sound he wanted. Paul started his studio in the garage of his home on North Curson Street in Hollywood. The studio drew many vocalists and musicians who wanted the benefit of his expertise. His experiments included microphone placement, track speed, and recording overdubs. These methods resulted in a clarity previously unheard in this type of multitrack recording. People began to consider his recording techniques as instruments—as important to production as a guitar, bass, or drums.

Capitol Records released "Lover (When You're Near Me)", on which Paul played eight different parts on electric guitar, some recorded at half-speed, hence "double-fast" when played back at normal speed for the master. This was the first time he used multitracking in a recording. His early multitrack recordings, including "Lover" and "Brazil", were made with acetate discs. He recorded a track onto a disk, then recorded himself playing another part with the first. He built the multitrack recording with overlaid tracks rather than parallel ones as he did later. By the time he had a result that satisfied him, he had discarded some five hundred recording disks.

As a teen he had built a disc-cutter assembly using the flywheel from a Cadillac, a dental belt and other parts from his father's car repair shop. Years later in his Hollywood garage, he used the acetate disc setup to record parts at different speeds and with delay, resulting in his signature sound with echoes and birdsong-like guitar riffs.

In 1949, Crosby gave Paul one of the first Ampex Model 200A reel to reel tape recorders. Paul invented sound on sound recording using this machine by placing an additional playback head, located before the conventional erase/record/playback heads. This allowed Paul to play along with a previously recorded track, both of which were mixed together onto a new track. The Ampex was a monophonic tape recorder with only one track across the entire width of quarter-inch tape, and therefore, the recording was "destructive" in the sense that the original recording was permanently replaced with the new, mixed recording. He eventually enhanced this by using one tape machine to play back the original recording and a second to record the combined track. This preserved the original recording.

In 1952, Paul invented the flange effect, wherein two recordings of the same sound run slightly asynchronously, causing phase cancellations that sweep through the frequency range. The first example of this can be heard on his song "Mammy's Boogie".

Observing film recordings inspired Paul to design the stacking of eight tape recorders. He worked with Ross Snyder on the design of the first eight-track recording deck built for him by Ampex for his home studio. Rein Narma built a custom 8-channel mixing console for him. The mixing board included in-line equalization and vibrato effects. He named the recorder "The Octopus" and the mixing console "The Monster". The name "octopus" was inspired by comedian W. C. Fields, who was the first person to hear Paul play his multi-tracked guitar experiments. "He came to my garage to make a little record (in 1946)," Les recalled. "I played him the acetate of 'Lover' that I'd done. When he heard it, he said, 'My boy, you sound like an octopus.'"

=== Les Paul and Mary Ford ===
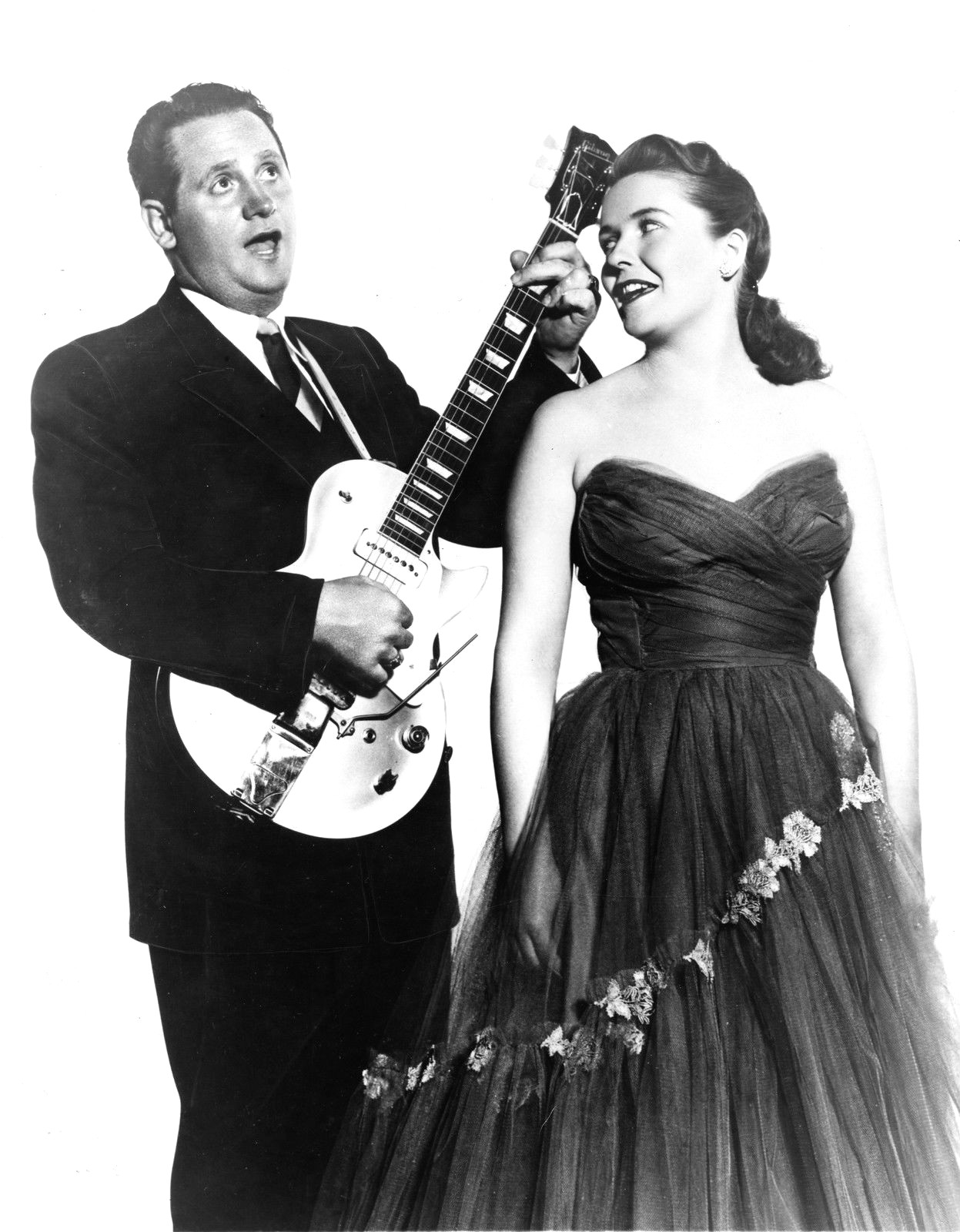
Paul and Mary Ford in 1954

In the summer of 1945, Paul met country-western singer Iris Colleen Summers. They began working together on Paul's radio show, as Rhubarb Red and The Ozark Apple Knockers with Mary Lou. Later Paul suggested the stage name Mary Ford. They married in Milwaukee in 1949.

Their hits included "How High the Moon", "Bye Bye Blues", "Song in Blue", "Don'cha Hear Them Bells", "The World Is Waiting for the Sunrise", and "Vaya con Dios". The songs were recorded with multiple tracks where Ford harmonized with herself and Paul played multiple layers of guitars.

They used the recording technique known as close miking where the microphone is less than 6 inches (15 cm) from the singer's mouth. This produces a more intimate, less reverberant sound than when a singer is 1 foot (30 cm) or more from the microphone. When using a pressure-gradient (uni- or bi-directional) microphone, it emphasizes low-frequency sounds in the voice due to the microphone's proximity effect and gives a more relaxed feel because the performer is not working as hard. The result is a singing style which diverged from the unamplified theater style of the musical comedies of the 1930s and 1940s.

They also performed music-hall style semi-comic routines with Mary mimicking whatever line Les decided to improvise.

=== Radio and television programs ===
Paul hosted a 15-minute radio program, The Les Paul Show, on NBC Radio in 1950, featuring his trio (himself, Ford and rhythm player Eddie Stapleton) and his electronics. The program was recorded from their home and with gentle humor between Paul and Ford bridging musical selections, some of which had already been successful on records, some of which anticipated the couple's recordings, and many of which presented re-interpretations of such jazz and pop selections as "In the Mood", "Little Rock Getaway", "Brazil", and "Tiger Rag". Many of these shows survive and are available from various sources.

When Paul used magnetic tape, he could take his recording equipment on tour, making episodes for his fifteen-minute radio show in a hotel room.

The show appeared on television a few years later with the same format, but excluding the trio and retitled Les Paul & Mary Ford at Home with "Vaya Con Dios" as the theme song. Sponsored by Warner–Lambert's Listerine mouthwash, it was aired on NBC television during 1954–1955, and then was syndicated until 1960. The five-minute show, consisting of the performance of only one or two songs, aired five times a day, five days a week, and therefore was used as a brief interlude or fill-in for programming schedules. Since Paul created the entire show himself, including audio and video, he maintained the original recordings and was in the process of restoring them to current quality standards until his death.

During his radio shows, Paul introduced the fictional "Les Paulverizer" device, which multiplies anything fed into it, such as a guitar sound or a voice. It was Paul's way of explaining how his single guitar could be multiplied to become a group of guitars. The device even became the subject of comedy, with Ford multiplying herself and her vacuum cleaner with it so she could finish the housework faster. Later, Paul created a real Les Paulverizer that he attached to his guitar. The invention allowed Paul to access pre-recorded layers of songs during live performances so he could replicate his recorded sound on stage.

=== Later career ===
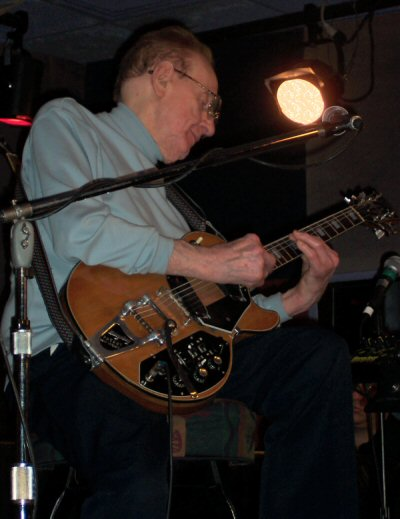
Paul in May 2004

In 1965, Paul went into semi-retirement, although he did return to his studio occasionally. He and Ford had divorced at the end of 1964 after she became tired of touring. One of Paul's most recognizable recordings from then through the mid-1970s was an album for London Records/Phase 4 Stereo, Les Paul Now (1968), on which he updated some of his earlier hits. Paul played the initial guitar track, and George Barnes laid down the additional tracks while Paul engineered in his home studio. He also recorded two albums, Chester and Lester (1976) and Guitar Monsters (1978), for RCA Victor, comprising a meld of jazz and country improvisation with guitar virtuoso Chet Atkins, backed by some of Nashville's celebrated studio musicians.

In 1969 Paul produced the album Poe Through the Glass Prism for RCA. The album featured songs based on Edgar Allan Poe's writing by the northeastern Pennsylvania band the Glass Prism. The album produced a single titled "The Raven" that appeared on Billboard's Hot 100.

As years progressed Paul played at slower tempos with a large pick that was easier to hold in his arthritic hand. In 2006, at the age of 90, he won two Grammy Awards at the 48th Annual Grammy Awards for his album Les Paul & Friends: American Made World Played. He also performed every Monday night at Manhattan's Iridium Jazz Club with guitarist Lou Pallo, bassist Paul Nowinski (and later, Nicki Parrott), and guitarist Frank Vignola and for a few years, pianist John Colianni. Paul, Pallo and Nowinski also performed at Fat Tuesdays.

Composer Richard Stein sued Paul for plagiarism, charging that Paul's "Johnny (is the Boy for Me)" was taken from Stein's 1937 song "Sanie cu zurgălăi" (Romanian for "Sleigh with Bells"). In 2000, a cover version of "Johnny" by Belgian musical group Vaya Con Dios that credited Paul prompted another action by the Romanian Musical Performing and Mechanical Rights Society.

Paul played a regular Monday night gig at the Iridium Nightclub from 1996 until his death.

== Artistry ==
Richard S. Ginell of AllMusic characterized Les Paul's playing style with "extremely rapid runs", "bluesy" string bends, "fluttered and repeated" single-note lead guitar lines, and chunking rhythm support". He was initially inspired by Django Reinhardt. Les Paul also incorporated elements of country into his guitar licks and "humorous crowd-pleasing effects". Ginell also made note of Paul's "brassy" playing style. Paul's jazz influence was still apparent on his popular music hits of the 1940s and 1950s. He did not read music and relied on his aural skills to mentally compose tunes.

He is considered innovative in his field with pioneering achievements in the development of the electric guitar, multi-track recording, solid-body guitar design, and electronic effects.

Jazz guitarists including George Benson, Al Di Meola, Stanley Jordan, Pat Martino, and Bucky Pizzarelli have cited Paul as an influence on their playing techniques and styles.

== Personal life ==
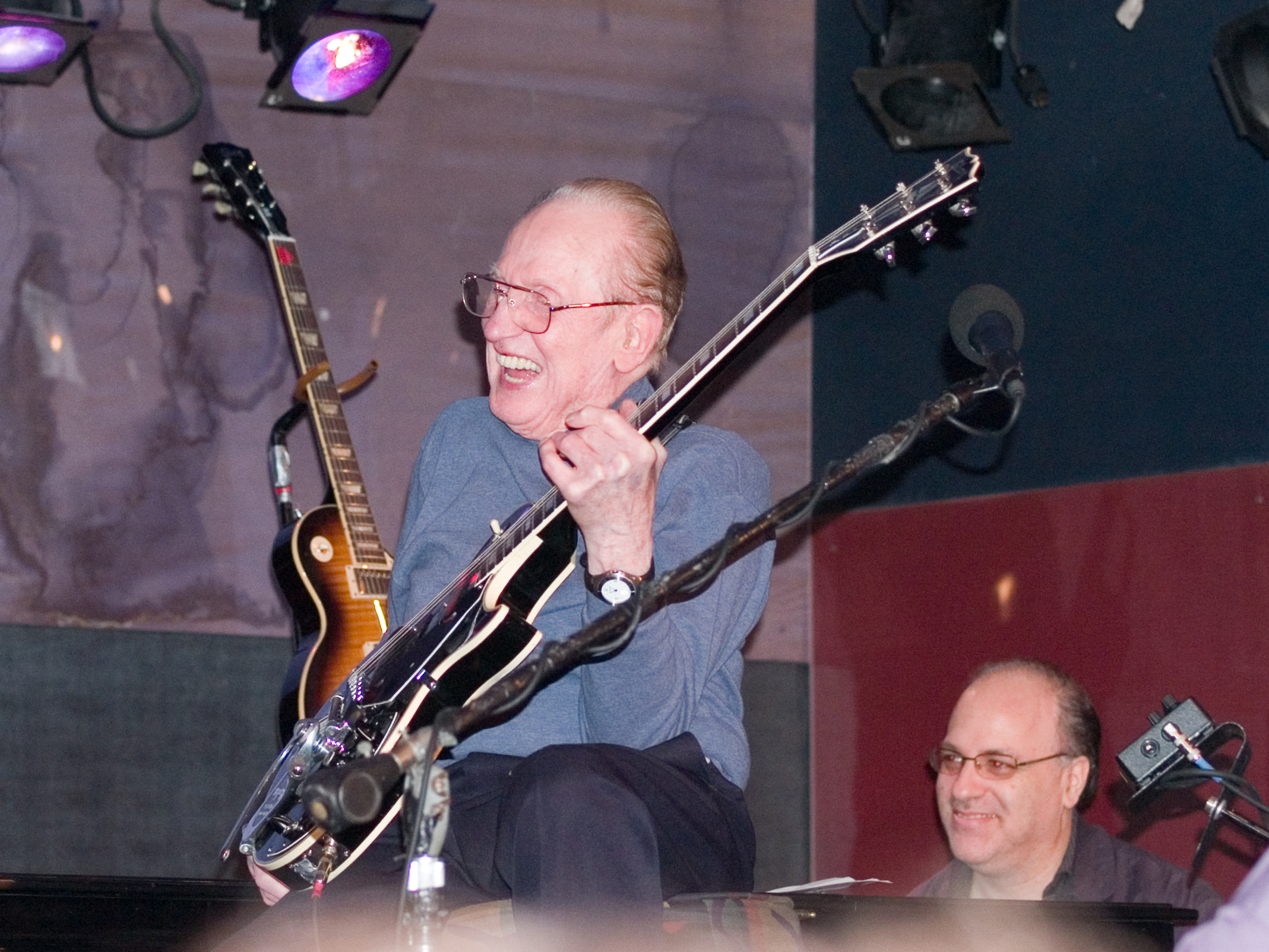
Paul with pianist John Colianni

Les Paul married Virginia Webb in 1937. They had two children, Les Paul Jr. (Rusty) (1941–2015), and Gene Paul (1944), who was named after actor-songwriter Gene Lockhart.

After getting divorced in 1949, Paul married Mary Ford (born Iris Colleen Summers). The best man and matron of honor were the parents of guitarist Steve Miller, whose family was from Milwaukee. Paul was Miller's godfather and his first guitar teacher. Ford gave birth to their first child on November 30, 1954, but the girl was born prematurely and died when she was four days old. They adopted a girl, Colleen, in 1958, and their son, Robert (Bobby), was born the following year. Paul and Ford divorced in December 1964.

Paul and Ford maintained a house in Mahwah, New Jersey, and after their divorce Ford lived there until her death in 1977.

In 1995, Paul established the Les Paul Foundation, which was designed to remain dormant until his death. The Les Paul Foundation aims to inspire innovative and creative thinking by sharing the legacy of Les Paul through support of music education, recording, innovation, and medical research related to hearing. The Foundation established the Les Paul Innovation Award in 1991 and the Les Paul Spirit Award in 2016.

=== Death ===
On August 12, 2009, Paul died of complications from pneumonia at White Plains Hospital in White Plains, New York. After hearing about his death, many musicians commented on his importance. Slash called him "vibrant and full of positive energy", while Richie Sambora called him a "revolutionary in the music business". The Edge said, "His legacy as a musician and inventor will live on and his influence on rock and roll will never be forgotten." On August 21, 2009, he was buried in Prairie Home Cemetery, Waukesha, Wisconsin.

== Awards and honors ==
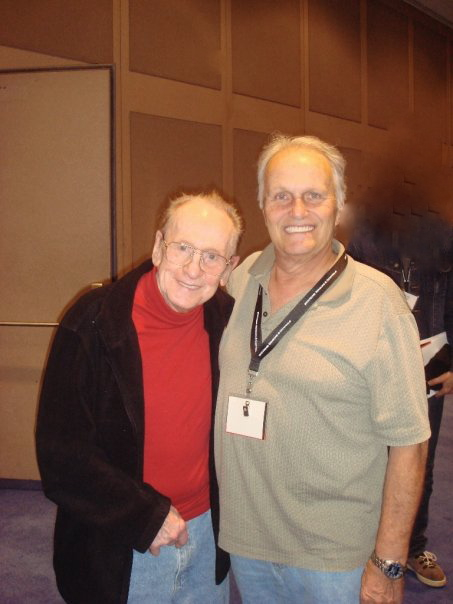
Paul and audio engineer Roger Nichols, both winners of Technical Grammy Awards

A few of Les Paul's many awards are listed below. In 2007, he was given the National Medal of Arts from U.S. President George W. Bush.

Paul was inducted into the National Inventors Hall of Fame (2005) for his development of the solid-body electric guitar. In 1988, he was inducted into the Rock and Roll Hall of Fame by guitarist Jeff Beck, who said, "I've copied more licks from Les Paul than I'd like to admit." He was also inducted into the Songwriters Hall of Fame (2005), the Big Band & Jazz Hall of Fame (1990), the New Jersey Inventors Hall of Fame (1996), and the New Jersey Hall of Fame (2010).

Two of his songs entered the Grammy Hall of Fame: "How High the Moon" and "Vaya Con Dios". In 1976, he and Chet Atkins received the Grammy Award for Best Country Instrumental. In 2005, he won Best Pop Instrumental for "Caravan" and Best Rock Instrumental for "69 Freedom Special."

In 1983, Paul received a Grammy Trustees Award for lifetime achievement. In 2001, he was honored with the Special Merit/Technical Grammy Award, which recognizes "individuals or institutions that have set the highest standards of excellence in the creative application of audio technology," a select award given to masters of audio innovation including Thomas Alva Edison, Leo Fender, and Beatles recording engineer Geoff Emerick. In 2004, he received an Emmy Lifetime Achievement Award in Engineering and a Lifetime Achievement in Music Education from the Wisconsin Foundation for School Music.

In 1960, he and Mary Ford received a star on the Hollywood Walk of Fame.

In 2009, Paul was named one of the top ten electric guitarists of all time by Time magazine. Two years later he was named the eighteenth greatest guitarist of all time by Rolling Stone magazine. During the same year, his name was added to the Nashville Walk of Fame.

In 2011, for Paul's birthday on June 9–10, an interactive Google Doodle was shown on the Google homepage where the Google logo itself is formed as a Les Paul guitar and the user was able to play and record music. By the next 48 hours, approximately 40 million songs were recorded by users.

=== Concerts and exhibitions ===
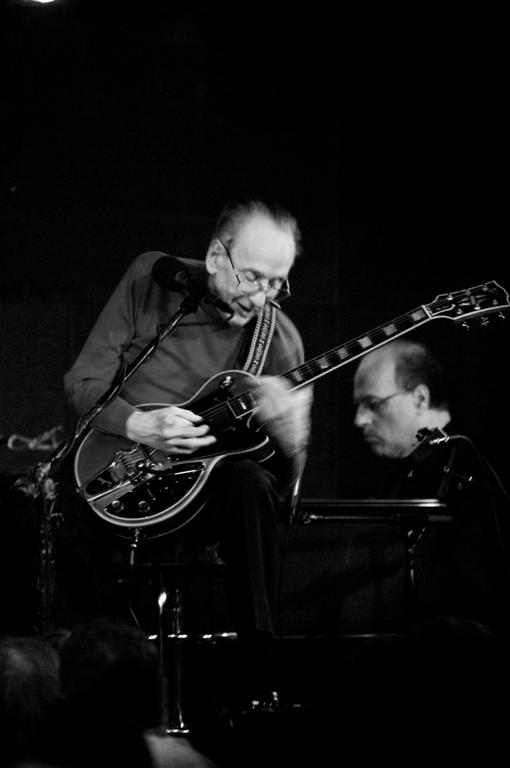
Paul playing a Gibson Les Paul at the Iridium Jazz Club in New York City, 2008

In July 2005, a 90th-birthday tribute concert was held for Les Paul at Carnegie Hall in New York City. After performances by Steve Miller, Peter Frampton, Jose Feliciano, and a number of others, Paul was presented with a commemorative guitar from the Gibson Guitar Corporation. Three years later, at a tribute concert at the State Theater in Cleveland, Ohio, he received the Rock and Roll Hall of Fame's American Music Masters Award. On June 9, 2015, a yearlong celebration of Paul's 100th birthday kicked off in Times Square with performances by musicians including Steve Miller, Jose Feliciano, and Neal Schon, a memorabilia exhibition, and a proclamation from the Les Paul Foundation declaring June 9 as Les Paul Day.

In 2007, the biographical film Les Paul Chasing Sound was aired on the public television series American Masters. The premier showing was held at Milwaukee's Downer Theater in conjunction with a concert Paul put on for the Waukesha County Historical Society & Museum. The film contained interviews with Les Paul, performances by his trio on his 90th birthday, and interview commentary and performances by other musicians.

In June 2008, an exhibit showcasing Paul's legacy and featuring items from his personal collection opened at Discovery World in Milwaukee. Paul played a concert in Milwaukee to coincide with the opening of the exhibit. Paul's hometown of Waukesha, Wisconsin, opened a permanent exhibit titled "The Les Paul Experience" at the Waukesha County Museum in June 2013. The exhibit features artifacts on loan from the Les Paul Foundation. A self-guided tour of Les Paul's Waukesha was created by the Les Paul Foundation.

A permanent Les Paul exhibit is also located at the Mahwah Historical Museum. Other museums that include Les Paul are the Museum of Making Music in Phoenix and the Grammy Museum in Newark, New Jersey.

In 2009, the concert film Les Paul Live in New York was aired on public television showing Les Paul performing on his 90th birthday at the Iridium Jazz Club in New York and in archival clips.

== Discography ==
=== Albums ===
- The New Sound (Capitol, 78 rpm and 45 rpm EP, 1950; 33 1/3 rpm LP, 1955)
- Les Paul's New Sound, Vol. 2 (Capitol, 1951)
- Bye Bye Blues! (Capitol, 1952)
- The Hit Makers! (Capitol, 1953)
- Les and Mary (Capitol, 1955)
- Songs of Today (Capitol, 45 rpm EP, 1956)
- Time to Dream (Capitol, 1957)
- The Hits of Les and Mary (Capitol, 1960)
- Les Paul and Mary Ford (Capitol, 33 1/3 rpm EP, 1961)
- Bouquet of Roses (Columbia, 1962)
- Warm and Wonderful (Columbia, 1962)
- Les Paul Now (Decca, 1968)
- The World Is Still Waiting For The Sunrise (Capitol, 1974)
- Chester and Lester with Chet Atkins (RCA Victor, 1976)
- Guitar Monsters with Chet Atkins (RCA Victor, 1978)
- Early Les Paul (Capitol, 1982)
- Feed Back 1944–1955 (Circle, 1986)
- The Best of the Capitol Masters: Selections from "The Legend and the Legacy" Box Set (Capitol, 1992)
- American Made World Played (Capitol, 2005)
- A Tribute to a Legend (Immergent, 2008)

==== With Les Paul And His Trio ====
- Hawaiian Paradise (Decca, 1946)
- Galloping Guitars (Decca, 1951)

=== Hit singles ===
Year	Single	Chart positions			
Year	Single	^{US}	^{CB}	^{US Country}	^{UK}
1945	"It's Been a Long, Long Time" (with Bing Crosby)	1			
1946	"Rumors Are Flying" (with The Andrews Sisters)	4			
1948	"Lover"	21			
1948	"Brazil"	22			
1948	"What Is This Thing Called Love?"	11			
1950	"Nola"	9			
1950	"Goofus"	21			
1950	"Little Rock Getaway"	18			
1950	"Tennessee Waltz"	6			
1951	"Jazz Me Blues"	23			
1951	"Mockin' Bird Hill" (gold record)	2		7	
1951	"How High the Moon" (gold record)^{A}	1			
1951	"Josephine"	12			
1951	"I Wish I Had Never Seen Sunshine"	18			
1951	"The World Is Waiting for the Sunrise" (gold record)	2			
1951	"Whispering"	7			
1951	"Just One More Chance"	5			
1951	"Jingle Bells"	10			
1952	"Tiger Rag"	2			
1952	"I'm Confessin'"	13			
1952	"Carioca"	14			
1952	"In the Good Old Summertime"	15			
1952	"Smoke Rings"	14			
1952	"Meet Mister Callaghan"	5	4		
1952	"Take Me in Your Arms and Hold Me"	15	22		
1952	"Lady of Spain"	8			
1952	"My Baby's Comin' Home"	7	11		
1953	"Bye Bye Blues"	5	14		
1953	"I'm Sitting on Top of the World"	10	8		
1953	"Sleep"	21	31		
1953	"Vaya Con Dios" (gold record)	1	1		7
1953	"Johnny (Is the Boy for Me)"	15	25		
1953	"The Kangaroo"	25	23		
1953	"Don'cha Hear Them Bells"	13	28		
1954	"I Really Don't Want To Know"	11	33		
1954	"South"		18		
1954	"I'm a Fool to Care"	6	13		
1954	"Auctioneer"		28		
1954	"Whither Thou Goest"	10	12		
1954	"Mandolino"	19	22		
1955	"Song in Blue"		17		
1955	"Someday Sweetheart"		39		
1955	"No Letter Today"		27		
1955	"Hummingbird"	7	6		
1955	"Amukiriki"	38	24		
1955	"Magic Melody"	96	43		
1956	"Texas Lady"	91	47		
1956	"Cimarron (Roll On)"		48		
1956	"Moritat"	49			
1956	"Nuevo Laredo"	91			
1957	"Cinco Robles"	35	24		
1958	"Put a Ring on My Finger"	32	43		
1958	"Jealous Heart"		71		
1961	"Jura"	37	81		
1961	"It's Been a Long, Long Time"	105			

- ^{A} peaked at No. 2 on Hot R&B/Hip-Hop Songs charts

=== Singles ===
- "It's Been a Long, Long Time"—Bing Crosby with Les Paul & His Trio (1945), No. 1 on Billboard Pop singles chart, 1 week, December 8
- "Rumors Are Flying"—The Andrews Sisters with Les Paul and Vic Schoen & His Orchestra (1946)
- "This Can't Be Love"//"Up And At 'Em"—The Les Paul Trio (1946), V-Disc 664A
- "Guitar Boogie" (1947)
- "Lover (When You're Near Me)" (1948)
- "Brazil" (1948)
- "What Is This Thing Called Love?" (1948)
- "Suspicion"—as Rhubarb Red with Fos Carling (1948)
- "Nola" (1950)
- "Goofus" (1950)
- "Dry My Tears"/"Cryin'" (1950)
- "Little Rock Getaway" (1950/1951)
- "Tennessee Waltz"—Les Paul & Mary Ford (1950/1951), No. 1, Cashbox
- "Mockin' Bird Hill"—Les Paul & Mary Ford (1951), No. 1, Cashbox
- "How High The Moon"—Les Paul & Mary Ford (1951), No. 1, Billboard Pop singles chart, nine weeks, April 21 – June 16; No. 1, Cashbox, two weeks; No. 2, R&B chart
- "I Wish I Had Never Seen Sunshine"—Les Paul & Mary Ford (1951)
- "The World Is Waiting for the Sunrise"—Les Paul & Mary Ford (1951), No. 2, Billboard; No. 3, Cashbox
- "Just One More Chance"—Les Paul & Mary Ford (1951)
- "Jazz Me Blues" (1951)
- "Josephine" (1951)
- "Whispering" (1951)
- "Jingle Bells" (1951)
- "Tiger Rag"—Les Paul & Mary Ford (1952), No. 2, Billboard; No. 8, Cashbox
- "I'm Confessin' (That I Love You)"—Les Paul & Mary Ford (1952)
- "Carioca" (1952)
- "In the Good Old Summertime"—Les Paul & Mary Ford (1952)
- "Smoke Rings"—Les Paul & Mary Ford (1952)
- "Meet Mister Callaghan" (1952), No. 5, Billboard
- "Take Me in Your Arms and Hold Me"—Les Paul & Mary Ford (1952)
- "Lady of Spain" (1952)
- "My Baby's Coming Home"—Les Paul & Mary Ford (1952)
- "Bye Bye Blues"—Les Paul & Mary Ford (1953)
- "I'm Sitting on Top of the World"—Les Paul & Mary Ford (1953)
- "Sleep" (Fred Waring's theme song) (1953)
- "Vaya Con Dios"—Les Paul & Mary Ford (1953), No. 1, Billboard Pop singles chart, 11 weeks, August 8 – October 3, November 7–14; No. 1, Cashbox, five weeks
- "Johnny (Is The Boy for Me)"—Les Paul & Mary Ford (1953), No. 15, Billboard; No. 25, Cashbox
- "Don'cha Hear Them Bells"—Les Paul & Mary Ford (1953), No. 13, Billboard; No. 28, Cashbox
- "The Kangaroo" (1953), No. 25, Billboard; No. 23, Cashbox
- "I Really Don't Want To Know"—Les Paul & Mary Ford (1954)
- "I'm A Fool To Care"—Les Paul & Mary Ford (1954)
- "Whither Thou Goest"—Les Paul & Mary Ford (1954)
- "Mandolino"—Les Paul & Mary Ford (1954), No. 19, Billboard
- "Song in Blue"—Les Paul & Mary Ford (1954), No. 17, Cashbox
- "Hummingbird"—Les Paul & Mary Ford (1955)
- "Amukiriki (The Lord Willing)"—Les Paul & Mary Ford (1955)
- "Magic Melody"—Les Paul & Mary Ford (1955)
- "Texas Lady"—Les Paul & Mary Ford (1956)
- "Moritat" (Theme from "Three Penny Opera") (1956)
- "Nuevo Laredo"—Les Paul & Mary Ford (1956)
- "Cinco Robles (Five Oaks)"—Les Paul & Mary Ford (1957)
- "Put a Ring on My Finger"—Les Paul & Mary Ford (1958)
- "All I Need Is You"—Les Paul & Mary Ford (1959)
- "Jura (I Swear I Love You)"—Les Paul & Mary Ford (1961)
- "Love Sneakin' Up on You"—Les Paul, Joss Stone & Sting (2005)

== Compositions ==
Paul was also a prolific composer. Some of the songs he wrote were "Song in Blue", "Cryin'", "Hip-Billy Boogie", "Suspicion", "Mandolino", "Magic Melody", "Don'cha Hear Them Bells", "The Kangaroo", "Big-Eyed Gal", "Deep in the Blues", "All I Need is You", "Take a Warning", "Mammy's Boogie", "Up And At 'Em", "Pacific Breeze", "Golden Sands", "Hawaiian Charms", "Mountain Railroad", "Move Along, Baby (Don't Waste My Time)", "Dry My Tears", "I Don't Want You No More", "Doing the Town", "Les' Blues", "No Strings Attached", "Subterfuge", "Lament For Strings", "Five Alarm Fire", "You Can't Be Fit as a Fiddle (When You're Tight as a Drum)", and "Walkin' and Whistlin' Blues".

== See also ==
- List of Rock and Roll Hall of Fame inductees

== Bibliography ==
- Garrett, Charles, ed. "Paul, Les [Polfuss, Lester Williams]" The Grove Dictionary of American Music, 2nd edition. Oxford University Press. 2006. Print.
