= Ross S. Snyder =

Ross Snyder (1920–2008) was an American engineer best known for his contribution to recording techniques, most notably multi-tracking and early stereo recording. In his time with Ampex (1952–1957) as Audio Product Planning Manager he introduced stereo to American commercial recording and in collaboration with Les Paul developed multi-tracking.
