= The World Is Waiting for the Sunrise =

1919 song by Ernest Seitz and Gene Lockhart

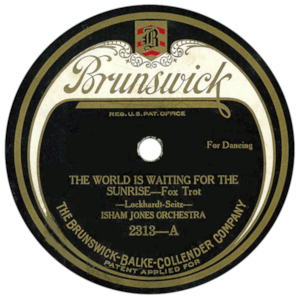
- 78 rpm record label

Single by Isham Jones' Orchestra
- B-side: "Eleanor"
- Published: January 24, 1919 Chappell & Co. Ltd., London
- Released: October 1922
- Recorded: July 1922
- Studio: Brunswick Studios, New York City
- Genre: American dance music, jazz
- Length: 3:02
- Label: Brunswick 2313
- Composer: Raymond Roberts (pseud. of Ernest Seitz)
- Lyricist: Gene Lockhart

Isham Jones' Orchestra singles chronology
"On the Alamo" (1922)	"The World Is Waiting for the Sunrise" (1922)	"Broken Hearted Melody" (1923)

The World Is Waiting for the Sunrise (1919 lyrics)

Down in the lazy west rides the moon,
Warm as a night in June;
Stars shimm'ring soft in a bed of blue,
While I am calling and calling you.
Sweetly you are dreaming,
As the dawn comes slowly streaming;
Waken love in your bower,
Greet our trysting hour.
Dear one the world is waiting for the sunrise;
Ev'ry rose is heavy with dew.
The thrush on high, his sleepy mate is calling
And my heart is calling you!

"The World Is Waiting for the Sunrise" is a post-World War I popular song with lyrics by Canadian-born American actor Eugene Lockhart, and music composed by Canadian-born concert pianist Ernest Seitz in 1918. He later claimed he conceived the refrain when he was 12 years old. Embarrassed about writing popular music, Seitz used the pseudonym "Raymond Roberts" when the song was published on January 24, 1919, by Chappell & Co. Ltd., London, UK. The song was introduced in the traveling play The Pierrot Players, in which Lockhart acted in. Later popularized as a recording by Les Paul and Mary Ford in the 1950s. In a 1969 episode of 'What's My Line?' daughter June Lockhart stated that her family still receives royalty payments for the song.

== Early recordings and success ==
The earliest documented recordings came in 1921. On March 9, Charles Hackett of Columbia Records recorded 3 takes in New York, but they were not released, and are assumed lost. Then, on July 5, at Edison Records New York Studio, Edward Allen (a vocalist) accompanied by an orchestra, also recorded three takes, with two released on Edison 80667 10-inch disc. On December 21, 1921, at Victor's Church Studio in Camden, New Jersey, Victor recording artist John Steel cut a 10-inch disc, Victor 18844, that was released the following March, with some degree of success, reaching number 4 on the Popular music chart.

The most successful early recording of the song took place in the summer of 1922 (the exact date has been lost), when aspiring composer and band leader, Isham Jones, along with his popular dance Orchestra, recorded two instrumental sides for Brunswick Records in New York City (the B-side was "Eleanor"), released in October on Brunswick 2313.

Jones was well into a hot streak started in July 1921, when "Make Believe" hit number 5 in July 1921. Then Jones reached the number 1 spot twice, first with "Wabash Blues" in January 1922 (for six weeks), and again in June for another four weeks, with his own composition, "On the Alamo". After "My Honey's Lovin' Arms" peaked at number 4, "The World Is Waiting For The Sunrise" was released in October, becoming the band's fifth straight top 5 single. It entered the National Charts on November 11, 1922, for a six-week run, peaking at the number 2 position. It ranked as the number 19 single for year 1922.

It turned out Isham Jones was just getting started, not only as a recording artist, but as a future Hall-of-Fame composer. In the next two years, four of his compositions occupied the top spot for 20 total weeks. "Swingin' Down the Lane", "Spain", "It Had to Be You" and "I'll See You in My Dreams" cemented Jones' standing as one of the top three bandleaders of the 1920s, overshadowed by Paul Whiteman, and perhaps Ben Selvin.

== Revival by Les Paul and Mary Ford ==
Isham Jones took ""The World Is Waiting for the Sunrise" to its highest position in 1922, but he was forced to share the record in 1951. Les Paul and Mary Ford also took it to the number 2 position, though they did this thirty years later. Les Paul, innovator of guitar designs and multitrack recording techniques, recorded "The World Is Waiting" with his wife, Mary Ford, on vocals, during July 1951 for Capitol Records, Los Angeles. Thanks to their own television show, as well as an appearance on Ed Sullivan August 19, it reached number 2 for two straight weeks in October.

This promotional clip provided by The Ed Sullivan Show, filmed on August 19, 1951, of Les Paul and Mary Ford performing "The World Is Waiting For The Sunrise", answers questions about the popularity of their act, as well as this song, both which became a phenomenon that fall.

== Legacy ==
More than one hundred recorded versions have been commercially released. Initially, when the song's hopeful sentiment appealed to audiences in the post-World War I era, it was recorded by both singers and instrumentalists, including Morton Downey, Fritz Kreisler, and Ted Lewis. Later, as a popular vehicle for improvisation, it was recorded by many jazz musicians, among them Benny Goodman, Duke Ellington, Django Reinhardt, Mel Powell, Jess Stacy, Jack Teagarden and Cuban mambo master Machito. It has also become something of a standard in bluegrass music, being recorded by such popular artists as the Seldom Scene, Raymond Fairchild, and Don Reno.

The Beatles (then The Quarrymen), recorded a home version on a Grundig tape recorder in April or May, 1960. The Beatles version featured guitars by Harrison and Lennon and vocals from Paul McCartney. Canadian jazz musicians to record the song include Bert Niosi (1946), Peter Appleyard (1957), Ed Bickert (1979), and Oscar Peterson (1980). A version by doo-wop group the Larks is featured in the 1955 film Rhythm and Blues Revue.

Takeshi Terauchi & Bunnys recorded an instrumental version of the song on their 1967 album, The World Is Waiting For Terry.

A cover of the song was done by Stan Laurel in the Laurel and Hardy film The Flying Deuces (1939), as Laurel takes the bed strings and plays the song on it like a harp. It was an ironic gesture as the boys, having joined the French Foreign Legion and been caught deserting, were to be shot at dawn.

The song is also referenced in Tennessee Williams's play The Glass Menagerie as the music heard emanating from the Paradise Dance Hall across the alley from the Wingfields' tenement building. The dance hall represents the outside world that Tom hopes in some ways to join.

The Les Paul and Mary Ford version of the song appears in a teaser video released by American band The Voidz to promote their album Virtue. The video was directed by Warren Fu.

Stan Freberg did a comic version of the song, in which the chorus speeds up with the music, causing an explosion at the end of the song.

== See also ==
- List of pre-1920 jazz standards
