= Mary Ford =

American country music vocalist and guitarist (1924–1977)

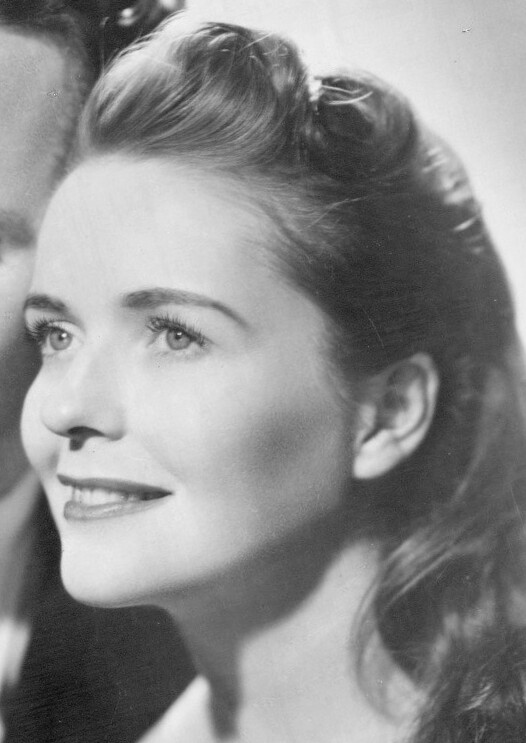
- Ford in 1953

Background information
- Born: Iris Colleen Summers; July 7, 1924; El Monte, California, U.S.
- Died: September 30, 1977 (aged 53) Arcadia, California, U.S.
- Genres: Western; country; pop; Gospel
- Occupation: Musician
- Instruments: Guitar; vocals
- Years active: 1939–1966
- Labels: Capitol; Columbia; Calendar
- Spouses: David Marvin Palmquist (m. 1941) Marvin Chester Watson (m. 1942–1946) Les Paul (m. 1949; div. 1964) Donald E. Hatfield (m. 1965)

Mary Ford (born Iris Colleen Summers; July 7, 1924 – September 30, 1977) was an American guitarist and vocalist, comprising half of the husband-and-wife musical team Les Paul and Mary Ford. Between 1950 and 1954, the couple had 16 top-ten hits, including "How High the Moon" and "Vaya con Dios", which were number one hits on the Billboard charts. In 1951 alone they sold six million records. With Paul, Ford became one of the early practitioners of multi-tracking.

== Early life ==
Born Iris Colleen Summers, Mary Ford was born in El Monte, California, the second daughter of Marshall McKinley Summers (born February 13, 1896, in Ridgway, Illinois; died August 5, 1981, in Los Angeles), a Nazarene minister, who later became a painting contractor, and his wife, Dorothy May White Summers. Mary Ford was the sister of Byron Fletcher Summers, Esther E. Williams, Carol Jean Corona, Bruce Summers, Eva Wootten, and Bob Summers. Ford came from a musical family. Her parents left Missouri, travelling cross-country while singing gospel music and preaching at revival meetings across the United States. They eventually settled in Southern California, where they were heard over KPPC-AM, Pasadena's first Christian radio station. Her sisters and brothers were all musicians.

While still a junior high school student, Colleen Summers and Mildred L. "Milly" Watson (later Millie Pace) (born February 26, 1922, in Los Angeles; died August 2, 1976, in Orange County, California), a local girl, performed together in churches in Pasadena, California, and later made gospel recordings with Milly's older brother, Marvin, for whom she wrote some songs. In 1939 Summers and Milly won a Pasadena talent contest judged by "several Hollywood notables, including a very young Judy Garland". Hoping to have a musical career, Summers and Milly Watson lost interest in school, played truant frequently and eventually quit school, only to find employment as an usher in a movie theatre.

== Early career ==
By 1943, Colleen Summers, with Vivian Earles and June Widener, the sister of western swing guitarist-vocalist Jimmie Widener, formed the Sunshine Girls, a western trio who sang backup to Jimmy Wakely and his trio. They were regulars on The Hollywood Barn Dance, a successful weekly CBS Radio program broadcast on Saturday nights, and hosted by Foy Willing and emceed by Cliffie Stone.

In 1944, the Sunshine Girls trio appeared with Wakely in the PRC film I'm from Arkansas, in which they sang "You Are My Sunshine" and "Whistlin' (Walkin') Down the Lane With You" with Wakely.

In 1945, when Eddie Dean introduced her to guitarist Les Paul, she was a popular western vocalist on KXLA's Dinner Bell Round-Up Time. The two began performing together in 1946. After Summers left the Sunshine Girls to work with Paul and his trio, she was replaced initially by Marilyn Myers Tuttle. After Tuttle left, Summers' older sister, Eva, sang with Earles and Widener as the Three Rays on the Jimmy Wakely Show on CBS.

Colleen Summers appeared on Gene Autry's Melody Ranch CBS radio program as a cast member and featured vocalist from July through early November 1946.

In 1946–48, Summers was a regular actor in the drama portion of The All-Star Western Theatre, a radio program hosted by Foy Willing and his Riders of the Purple Sage.

By 1947, Summers became romantically involved with Les Paul, whose first marriage to Virginia M. Webb was failing, as it could no longer endure the stresses and strains of his show-business career. In January 1948, while traveling on Route 66 through Oklahoma, the couple's car driven by Summers skidded off the road and plummeted 20 feet into a frozen creek bed. After the accident, Summers identified herself to authorities as Iris Watson. Among Paul's many injuries, his right elbow was shattered, and it would be eighteen months before he could play guitar again. After Paul's wife Virginia took their two sons to Chicago, Summers moved in with Paul in his house on Curson Avenue, where she took care of him as he recuperated from the effects of the car accident.

By the summer of 1949, Summers was performing under the stage name of Mary Ford. To avoid confusing her established western music audience, initially Paul named his musical partner "Mary Lou", but later selected the stage name "Mary Ford" from a telephone directory so her name would be almost as short as his.

That same year, Les Paul divorced his wife and wed Mary Ford on December 29 in a "small private ceremony without much fanfare" in Milwaukee, Wisconsin. The couple had three children: a baby born on November 26, 1954, who died four days later; Mary Colleen Paul, whom they fostered from 1958; and Robert Ralph "Bobby" Paul (born in 1959).

== Career with Les Paul ==
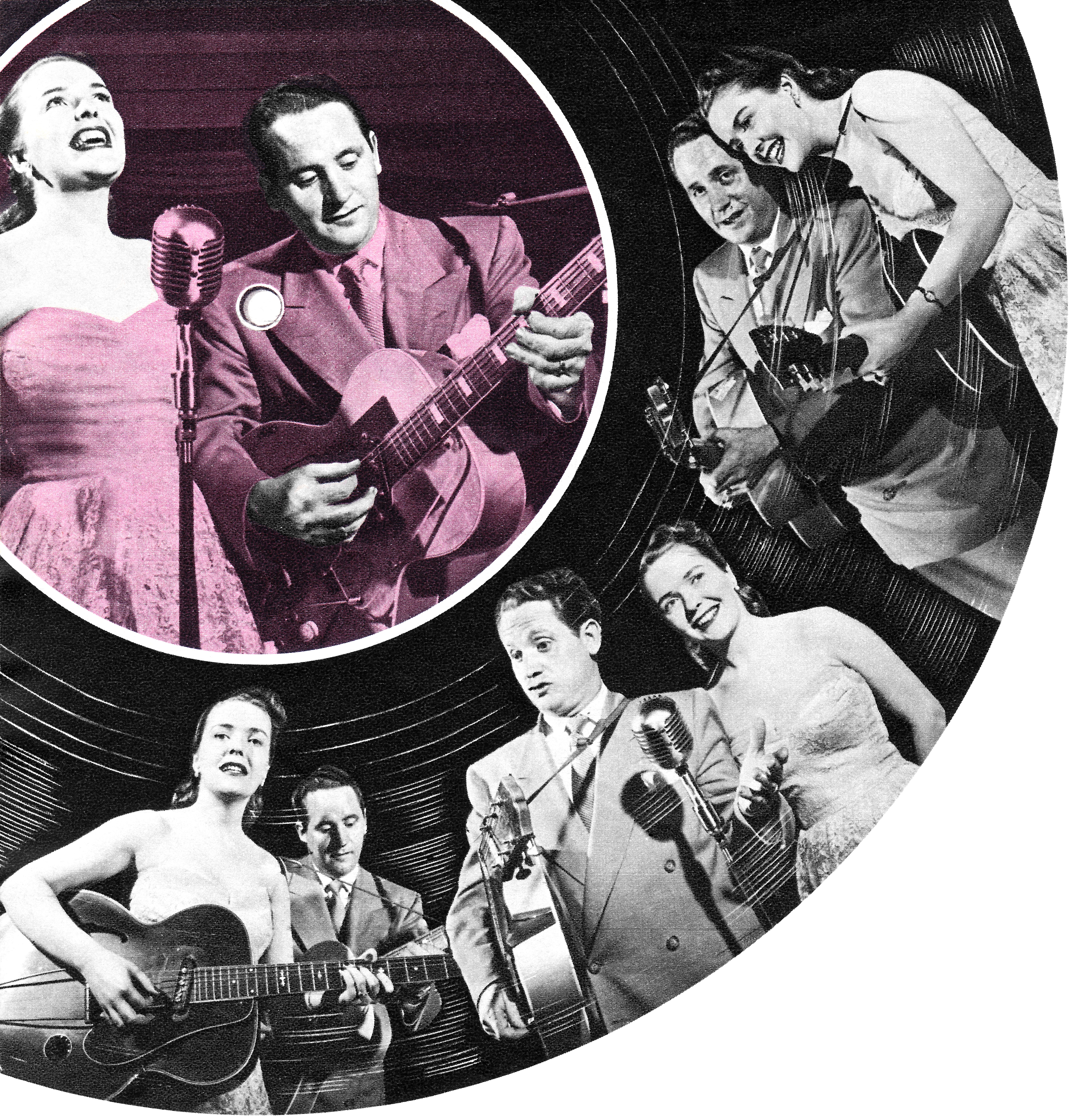
Montage of photographs of Les Paul and Mary Ford in the August 1951 issue of The American Magazine.

Shortly after their wedding, Paul and Ford began making radio programs together for NBC, including Les Paul and Mary Ford at Home, a fifteen-minute program that was pre-recorded and broadcast every Friday night.

Ford and Paul were music superstars during the first half of the 1950s, putting out 28 hits for Capitol Records between 1950 and 1957, including "Tiger Rag", "Vaya con Dios" (11 weeks at No. 1), "Mockin' Bird Hill" (top 10), "How High the Moon" (nine weeks at No. 1), "Bye Bye Blues," and "The World Is Waiting for the Sunrise". These songs featured Ford harmonizing with herself, giving the vocals a novel sound. Paul and Ford did all their recording at home or on the road and submitted the masters to Capitol, with Paul dictating to the record company what songs were destined to become hits. Paul and Ford also used the now-ubiquitous recording technique known as close miking, where the microphone is less than six inches from the singer's mouth. This produces a more intimate, less reverberant sound than when the singer is a foot or more from the microphone (see proximity effect). It also emphasizes low-frequency sounds in the voice. The result was a singing style that diverged strongly from earlier styles, such as vocals in musical comedies of the 1930s and 1940s.

After extensive touring and recording, the couple decided to leave Hollywood and moved to New York City to make the crossover from radio to television. They took a cramped apartment in Paul's former New York neighborhood, where they conceived and recorded their arrangement of "How High The Moon", a hard-swinging multi-layered arrangement containing twelve overdubs using the guitar and Ford's voice. While Capitol was reluctant to release this song, after they had scored several more hits with Capitol, including, 'Tennessee Waltz" and "Mockin' Bird Hill", "How High The Moon" was released in March 1951. Within a month, "How High The Moon" and "Mockin' Bird Hill" captured Your Hit Parade's number one and number two spots, respectively.

During 1951, Ford and Paul earned $500,000, and had recorded more top ten hits for the year than Bing Crosby, Frank Sinatra, and the Andrews Sisters combined. They also tied Patti Page for top selling recording artist, having sold more than six million records since January 1951.

Paul bought a Cadillac to use on their expanding road tours with plenty of space for all their electronic gear. They also purchased a woodland retreat in Mahwah, New Jersey, in the Ramapo Mountains, and their mansion included a recording studio and an echo chamber carved out of a neighboring mountain. In September 1952, after cutting "I'm Sitting on Top of the World", Ford and Paul sailed for London to appear at the Palladium Theatre, where they debuted before Queen Elizabeth II and the royal family. In 1952, their innovative sound was satirized by Stan Freberg in his recording of "The World Is Waiting for the Sunrise" (Capitol, F 2279).

In 1953, the couple recorded "Vaya con Dios" (Capitol 2486), the biggest-selling song of their career. It was released in June 1953, entered the Billboard charts on June 13, 1953, reached number one on August 8, and remained there for a total of nine weeks. The song lasted thirty-one weeks on the chart, and also reached number one on the Cash Box chart.

Following the success of "Vaya con Dios", in 1953 the couple hosted The Les Paul and Mary Ford Show, their own daily television program broadcast from their Mahwah home. The show, which was five minutes long and sponsored by Listerine, ran from 1953 to 1960 on NBC television and in syndication. In early 1955, the rise in popularity of rock and roll music eventually threatened the popularity of many performers, including Paul and Ford. In 1955, they gave a concert at Carnegie Hall, and in 1956, the couple performed at the Eisenhower White House.

With the growth of rock and roll, Ford and Paul faded from the charts in the late 1950s.

In 1956, Ford separated briefly from Paul when she ran away to Amarillo, Texas.

In July 1958, Paul and Ford left Capitol and signed with the Columbia label, but the move failed to restore their declining career, and Ford began increasingly suffering from alcoholism. In 1961, they appeared on NBC's Five Star Jubilee.

Les and Mary divorced in December 1964.

== Later years ==
In November 1963, Ford released her first solo single, an English-language version of "Dominique", for Calendar Records.

In about 1965, Ford married Donald Hatfield, whom she had known since high school, and they settled in Monrovia, California. Foy Willing and his wife attended the wedding reception.

Ford and her sisters were used as vocalists on Foy Willing's album The New Sound of American Folk, which was recorded at their brother Bobby Summers' Sound House Recorders in El Monte, California, and released on the Jubilee label.

Bassist Red Wootten, who married Mary's sister Eva Summers, wrote his memories of playing at the Crescendo in Los Angeles with Mary, her sister Carol and her brother, Bob Summers:

My brother, Buddy Wootten, also a bassist, called me from Atlanta to tell me he had just finished working the Fox Theater with Les Paul and Mary Ford. Mary also told me this later. This was while I was holding forth with Woody Herman Orchestra. So, later when I had married her sister (Eva), we worked with her other sister and Bob Summers (her brother) on guitar (sounds like Les Paul too) and Mary's other sister Carol. The gig was the Crescendo club right in the middle of Sunset Strip. A very hip joint!

Mary used a drummer added to Bob, Mary and myself on electric bass. We did almost all the Les Paul-Mary Ford recordings but with more heavy end on the bass. Les having used guitar on his bass tracks with Mary earlier. On all their recordings (as good as they were), I always missed that deep dark sound ... Mary (bless her heart) recorded a few of my compositions (never released), but she did an excellent job as always. Mary divorced Les Paul and later married her old school friend from Monrovia, California, namely Don Hatfield, who owned a large construction company in California. He is still with us, and I see him occasionally. Doing great, but he misses Mary.

Mary Ford came from a musical family, and after leaving Les Paul, she sometimes performed with her sisters, Carol, Eva and Esther. Seen here (l to r) are Carol and Eva Summers with Millie Pace. The guitarist who recorded with the Millie Pace Trio was Bob Summers, Mary Ford's brother.

Bob Summers, my brother-in-law, has come into his own over the years too. Bob and I worked a lot on MGM records with the Mike Curb scene, early 1960s. He also was chief arranger for the Mike Curb Congregation, and they recorded some of my material, great too! Also Bob and I worked at Capitol Records for Ken Nelson and Cliffie Stone, passed recently. Too many country artists to even name nearly all of them: Hank Thompson, Wynn Stewart, Rose Maddox and others. Roy Lanham did one of his better albums at the Sound House, Merced, in El Monte (my old stamping grounds) and Mary Ford's home place, 9840 Kale Street. Bruce Summers (who is no longer with us), a piano man whom I played with a few times; a real swinger too.

In Downey, California, Mary's sister Esther Williams played the organ in The Village Restaurant. Esther's daughter, Esther Colleen "Suzee" Williams, recalled one amusing incident at the restaurant in the years after Mary Ford and Les Paul had split up:

There was one singer that came in to sing with my mom. His name was Lou Monica. Well, Mary asked him to learn the song "Donkey Serenade." It's not an easy song to sing. However, Mr. Monica agreed, and after a couple of weeks he said he was ready. As he began to sing, the doors of the club opened wide, and in came Mary, dressed in black with a black gaucho hat, on top of a donkey! Mr. Monica never skipped a beat.

== Awards and honors ==
Ford and Paul were awarded a star on the Hollywood Walk of Fame for Recording at 1541 Vine Street in Hollywood. In 1978, they were inducted into the Grammy Hall of Fame.

== Death ==
Ford succumbed to complications of alcohol abuse in 1977. After eight weeks in a diabetic coma, she died in Arcadia, California, at the age of 53. She is buried at Forest Lawn-Covina Hills in Covina Hills, California. Although her year of birth has been variously reported as either 1924, 1925, or 1928, the year 1924 is engraved on her tombstone, along with "Vaya con Dios" ("Go with God"), the name of one of her most popular songs.

== Documentary film ==
Interviews and performance footage of the couple are featured in the musical documentary Chasing Sound: Les Paul at 90, directed by John Paulson (Johnny Mathis Live, An Evening with Chita Rivera). Distributed by Koch Entertainment, the film premiered May 9, 2007 at the Downer Theater in Milwaukee, Wisconsin, followed by its television premiere, July 11, 2007, on PBS as part of its American Masters series.

== Discography ==
=== Hit singles ===
- "Vaya con Dios"
- "Jura"
- "Tennessee Waltz"
- "Mockin' Bird Hill"
- "How High the Moon"
- "The World Is Waiting for the Sunrise"
- "Whispering"
- "My Baby's Coming Home"
- "Lady of Spain"
- "Bye Bye Blues"
- "I'm Sitting on Top of the World"

=== Albums ===
- Les Paul's New Sound, Vol. 2 (Capitol, 1951)
- Bye Bye Blues! (Capitol, 1952)
- The Hit Makers! (Capitol, 1953)
- Les and Mary (Capitol, 1955)
- Time to Dream (Capitol, 1957)
- Lover's Luau
- Bouquet of Roses (Columbia, 1962)
- Warm and Wonderful (Columbia, 1962)
- Swingin' South
- The World Is Still Waiting For The Sunrise (Capitol, 1974)

== Watch ==
- "Chasing Sound" trailer (10 minutes)

== Listen to ==
- Internet Archive: The Les Paul Show (11 episodes)
- Sounds like Les Paul/Mary Ford, but it's actually Mary Ford's sisters (Carol, Eva) and brother (Bob)
