= Calf Studio Gear =

Open source audio software

- Developer: Calf Studio Gear
- Stable release: 0.90.9 / 30 December 2025; 4 months ago
- Written in: C++ and GTK+
- Operating system: Linux
- License: LGPL
- Website: calf-studio-gear.org
- Repository: github.com/calf-studio-gear/calf

Calf Studio Gear, often referred to as Calf Plugins, is a set of open source LV2 plugins for the Linux platform. The suite intends to be a complete set of plugins for audio mixing, virtual instruments and mastering. As of version 0.90.0 there are 47 plugins in the suite.

== History ==
Calf Studio Gear development started in late 2007 when the LV2 plugin standard was in its infancy. Calf Studio Gear was one of the first projects to bring graphical audio plugins to Linux. The first versions up to 0.0.19 included support for LADSPA and DSSI as well which was dropped in December 2011.

The project was initiated by Krzysztof Foltman. In 2009 Markus Schmidt became interested in development of the plugin suite due to his frustration with proprietary software. He has been a driving force behind the plugins ever since and has been responsible for the overall design of Calf Studio Gear, as well as being the brains behind the DSP of many of its plugins.

== Included plugins ==
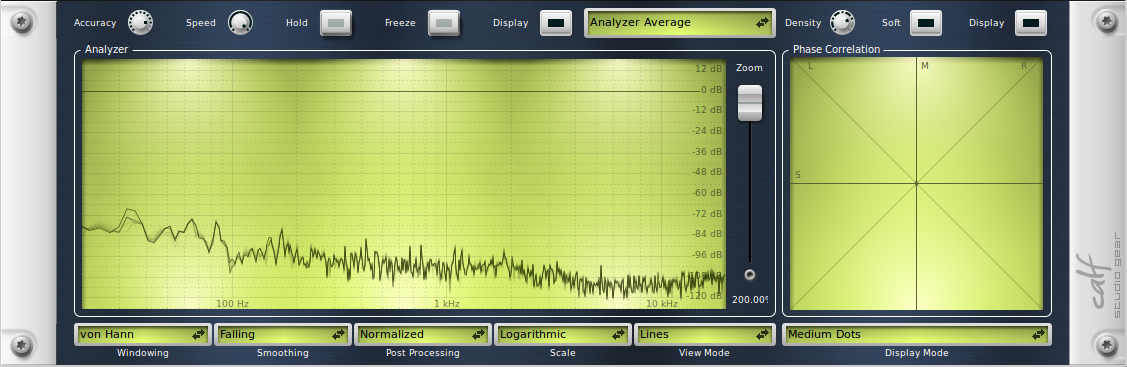
Calf Analyzer

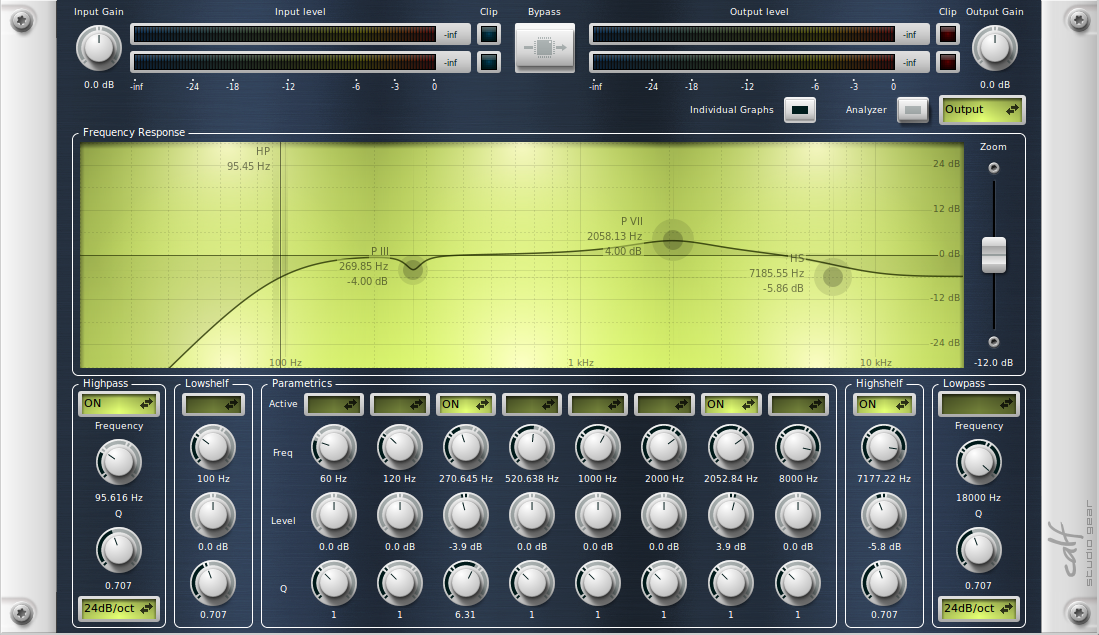
Calf 12 Band Equalizer

Calf Studio Gear is the most complete suite of music production plugins for Linux. The included plugins are:

- Instruments
  - Organ: organ emulator with full access to the sound generators
  - Monosynth: a monophonic synthesizer
  - Fluidsynth: SF2 player based on the FluidSynth library
  - Wavetable (experimental): wavetable based synthesizer in experimental state
- Modulation Effects
  - Multi Chorus: chorus effect with multiple, individual delay lines and graphical display
  - Phaser: phaser effect with graphical display of the frequency response
  - Flanger: flanger effect with graphical display of the frequency response
  - Rotary Speaker: Leslie speaker emulation
  - Pulsator: LFO for Tremolo effects
  - Ring Modulator: Ring modulation effect with two LFO modulating four different parameters
- Delay Effects
  - Reverb: Reverberation effect
  - Vintage Delay: beat-oriented delay effect with filters and synchronization
  - Compensation Delay Line: distance based delay for compensating speaker line-ups
  - Reverse Delay: reversed delay effect
- Dynamics
  - Compressor: compressor with New York compression and graphical display
  - Sidechain Compressor: compressor with filtered sidechain
  - Multiband Compressor: multiband compressor with four individual bands
  - Mono Compressor: another compressor based on a different routine
  - Deesser: De-essing with different filters and split mode
  - Gate: noise gate with parallel setting and graphical display
  - Sidechain Gate: noise gate with filtered sidechain
  - Multiband Gate: multiband noise gate with four individual bands
  - Limiter: lookahead limiter with automatic sustain control
  - Multiband Limiter: multiband limiter with four bands
  - Sidechain Limiter: multiband limiter with additional sidechain for giving importance to relevant signals
  - Transient Designer: controls transients and sustain
- Filters and Equalizers
  - Filter: filter for lowpass, highpass, bandpass and bandreject with graphical display
  - Filterclavier: filter controlled via MIDI
  - Envelope Filter: filter controlled via Envelope detector
  - Emphasis: filter for different pre- and de-emphasis like CD and vinyl production
  - Vocoder: vocoder effect for 8, 12, 16, 24 or 32 individual bands, with tilting and noise generator
  - 5-Band-Equalizer: parametrical equalizer offering high shelf, low shelf and three parametric bands, with analyzer
  - 8-Band-Equalizer: parametrical equalizer with high shelf, low shelf, low pass, high pass and four parametrical bands
  - 12-Band-Equalizer: parametrical equalizer with high shelf, low shelf, low pass, high pass and eight parametrical bands
  - 30-Band-Equalizer: graphical equalizer
- Distortion and Saturation
  - Saturator: enriches the signal with different harmonics
  - Exciter: harmonic exciter adding additional high frequency harmonics
  - Bass Enhancer: harmonic exciter adding low frequency harmonics
  - Tape Simulator: simulates the effects of magnetic tape and corresponding players
  - Vinyl: adds different controllable sounds produced by vinyl records and filters the signal
  - Crusher: Bitcrusher and sample rate reduction with smoothing and logarithmic reduction pattern
- Tools
  - Mono Input: splits a mono input to stereo, with phase control, phase inversion, soft clip and channel delay
  - Stereo Tools: stereo signal manipulation with M/S stereo en- and decoding, phase inversion, phase control, balance, soft clip and channel delay
  - Haas Stereo Enhancer: Precedence effect
  - Multi Spread: distributes the frequency response of a mono signal to stereo channels
  - Multiband Enhancer: enhances or reduces the stereo base and adds harmonics in four different frequency ranges
  - X-Over 2 Band: splits the signal in two individual frequency ranges
  - X-Over 3 Band: splits the signal in three individual frequency ranges
  - X-Over 4 Band: splits the signal in four individual frequency ranges
  - Analyzer: Spectrum analyzer with different viewing modes, L/R difference, spectralizer and goniometer
