= SoundFont =

File format containing audio samples for use in sequenced music

Example of what can be achieved with SoundFonts available in the public domain
1:15 song, MIDI played through SoundFonts

Playing a single MIDI file while switching between several SoundFont files available on the Internet. SoundFont files used in the chronological order: • SONiVOX EAS GM Wavetable (Legacy Android Soundset)* [1 MB] • RLNDGM.sf2 (Microsoft GS Wavetable Synth)* [3 MB] • FluidR3 GM.sf2 [141 MB] • SGM-V2.01.sf2 [235 MB] • Orpheus_1.047.sf2* [1.18 GB] • ChoriumRevA.sf2 (Modified) [56 MB] • ColomboGMGS2 SoundFont v14.5 [245 MB] *Marked soundfonts fall back to play "Muted Guitar" at Bank 0. whereas the MIDI file addresses "Muted Distortion Guitar" at Bank 1 (SC-88)

SoundFont is a brand name that collectively refers to a file format and associated technology that uses sample-based synthesis to play MIDI files. Originally developed by E-mu Systems and Creative Labs, it was first used on the Sound Blaster AWE32 sound card for its General MIDI support in 1994.

SoundFont files, commonly identified by the .sf2 file extension, store collections of audio samples along with instructions for how they should be played back at different pitches and velocities. The format became widely adopted in music production, video game audio, and software synthesizers. Following the expiration of Creative Technology's trademark, SoundFont has become an open and freely used standard in the audio software community.

SoundFont was a registered trademark of Creative Technology, Ltd. before 2026, and the exclusive license for re-formatting and managing E-mu Systems' and Creative's historical SoundFont content has been acquired by Digital Sound Factory.

== Specification ==
The newest official version of the SoundFont file format is 2.04 (or 2.4), released in 2005. It is based on the RIFF format.

An unofficial .sf3 update, which enables compression of sound samples using the OGG format, was created by Werner Schweer for MuseScore. Other programs, such as FluidSynth, have since added support for .sf3.

== History ==
The original SoundFont file format was developed in the early 1990s by E-mu Systems and Creative Labs. A specification for this version was never released to the public. The first and only major device to utilize this version was Creative's Sound Blaster AWE32 in 1994. Files in this format conventionally have the file extension of .SBK.

SoundFont 2.0 was developed in 1996. This file format generalized the data representation using perceptually additive real world units, redefined some of the instrument layering features within the format, added true stereo sample support and removed some obscure features of the first version whose behavior was difficult to specify. This version was fully disclosed as a public specification, with the goal of making the SoundFont format an industry standard. All SoundFont 1.0 compatible devices were updated to support the SoundFont 2.0 format shortly after it was released to the public, and consequently the 1.0 version became obsolete. Files in this and all other 2.x formats (see below) conventionally have the file extension of .SF2.

Version 2.01 (or 2.1) of the SoundFont file format was introduced in 1998, with an E-mu sound card product called the Audio Production Studio. This version added features allowing sound designers to configure the way MIDI controllers influence synthesizer parameters. It is bidirectionally compatible with 2.0, which means that synthesizers capable of rendering 2.01 format will also by definition render 2.0 format, and synthesizers that are only capable of rendering 2.0 format will also read and render the new format, but just not apply the new features.

SoundFont 2.04 was introduced in 2005 with the Sound Blaster X-Fi. The 2.04 format added support for 24-bit samples. The 2.04 format is bidirectionally compatible with the 2.01 format, so synthesizers that are only capable of rendering 2.0 or 2.01 format would automatically render instruments using 24-bit samples at 16-bit precision.

== Functionality ==
MIDI files do not contain any sounds, only instructions to play them. To play such files, sample-based MIDI synthesizers use recordings of instruments and sounds stored in a file or ROM chip. SoundFont-compatible synthesizers allow users to use SoundFont banks with custom samples to play their music.

Since MIDI files only contain instructions (akin to sheet music), SoundFonts can easily be swapped out to play MIDI files. Doing this changes the instrumentation (how it sounds), but retains the compositional integrity (how it is played). For example, a MIDI file with a sequence of chords might be rendered with a grand piano sound when using an orchestral SoundFont, or with a synthesizer-like tone when using an electronic SoundFont. The actual chords being played, however, do not change. This can be compared to word fonts, where switching the font changes the style of the letters, but keeps the original content.

A SoundFont bank contains base samples in PCM format (the audio data format most commonly used in WAV containers) mapped to sections on a musical keyboard. A SoundFont bank also contains other music synthesis parameters such as loops, vibrato effect, and velocity-sensitive volume changing.

SoundFont banks can conform to standard sound sets such as General MIDI, or use other wholly custom sound-set definitions like Roland GS and Yamaha XG.

== Software ==
=== Creation software (.sf2 format) ===
Several .sf2 editors are available including:

- Vienna from Creative Labs, requiring a particular sound card (such as Sound Blaster)
- Viena (with a single "n"), created in 2002
- Swami is a collection of free software for editing and managing musical instruments for MIDI music composition, used mainly under Linux
- Polyphone, free editor for Windows, Mac OS and Linux created in 2013

=== Playback software (.sf2 format) ===
Several standalone and plug-in based SoundFont players are available including:

- FluidSynth, an open source SoundFont synthesizer, available standalone and as LV2 plug-in
- LMMS, an open source digital audio workstation
- sforzando by Plogue, a VST/AU/RTAS plug-in also supporting .sfz
- TX16Wx Software Sampler, a plug-in modeled on hardware samplers

== See also ==
- DLS format – Sound bank standard for use in MIDI synthesisers
- FluidSynth – Software synthesizer
- General MIDI – Standard for MIDI-based music synthesizers
- Gravis Ultrasound – Sound card for IBM PC compatibles
- List of music software
- SFZ (file format) – Plain text file format for storing instrument data for software synthesizers
- Software synthesizer – Computer program that generates audio
- TiMidity++ – Software synthesizer
- WildMIDI – Software synthesizer
