= Gig Performer =

Audio host software

- Developers: Deskew Technologies, LLC
- Stable release: 5.3.3 / August 21, 2026; 52 days ago...
- Operating system: macOS, Microsoft Windows
- Platform: x64 ARM64
- Available in: English
- License: Proprietary
- Website: gigperformer.com

Gig Performer is a cross-platform audio plug-in host software package developed by Deskew Technologies. It is designed to provide a solution for playing an instrument and effect plug-ins live, without using a DAW. It was originally released in late 2016.

Gig Performer allows using virtual instrument plugins such as synths, samplers, guitar effect racks, EQ effects or compressors, and lets you switch from one set of plugins to another while playing.

Beside the Pro version, Gig Performer Essentials is released in 2025. It includes a special version of Synth Master with 1000 sounds, a special version of the Overloud TH-U amp sim and LostIn70s plugins.

== Features ==
Gig Performer manages collections of plug-ins in customizable organizational units called "rackspaces" consisting of one or more front panels. Plug-ins and other elements i.e. virtual instruments, effects, MIDI devices and or audio interfaces can be connected within rackspaces. Rackspaces can be further organized as parts of songs, where they can be reused along with song specific overrides.

Some features include:

- Visual workflow, by routing audio from one plugin to another by connecting them together with wires
- Support for VST, VST3 and AU plugins.
- Built-in audio and MIDI recorder
- An OSC implementation for remote control as well as OSC/MIDI conversion.
- Proprietary scripting language which allows advanced customization

== List or artists ==
Some of the artists who use Gig Performer are listed on Equipboard.
