= REAPER =

Digital audio workstation by Cockos

- Developer: Cockos
- Release: August 23, 2006; 19 years ago
- Stable release: 7.74 / 8 June 2026; 2 months ago
- Written in: C, C++, Assembly language
- Operating system: Windows XP and newer; macOS 10.5 and newer; Linux
- Platform: 32-bit x86 (Windows, macOS, Linux); x64 (Windows, macOS, Linux); ARMv7 (Linux); ARM64 (macOS Big Sur or later with Apple silicon platform and Linux)
- Type: Digital audio workstation and MIDI sequencer
- License: Proprietary
- Website: www.reaper.fm

REAPER (Rapid Environment for Audio Production, Engineering, and Recording) is a digital audio workstation, MIDI sequencer, and video editing software application created by Cockos. The current version is available for Microsoft Windows (XP and newer), macOS (10.5 and newer), and Linux. REAPER is capable of processing industry-standard audio and video media formats and is a compatible host for 32-bit and 64-bit plug-in formats such as VST and AU.

== History ==
REAPER development is led by Justin Frankel, who also created Winamp and the Gnutella peer-to-peer file sharing network. A preview was released in 2005 and the first official shareware release was in August 2006, with a download size of only 2MB and a "huge feature set, incredibly low price and surface simplicity".

Version 2.0 (October 2007) included a more sophisticated user interface, an extended mixer, and the ability to save and load screen layouts. This update also added the Zplane Elastique 2 algorithms for enhanced time-stretching and pitch shifting, supported Windows and Mac OS, and remained compact enough to run off a USB memory stick.

Version 3 (2009) added nested tracks, plugin controls in the mixer, VCA grouping, enhanced automation and MIDI features.

Version 4 (2011) continued Cockos' reputation of "listening and involving their user base with frequent updates, beta versions and forum discussion" while adding features such as automatable pitch shift envelopes, multichannel setups such as quad, 5.1, 7.1 and 9.1, improved project management, and window arrangement customization.

Version 5 (2015) added video editing capability, automation of individual effect parameters, enhanced scripting, and VST3 support.

Version 6 (2019) introduced Retina, HiDPI, and Metal display support for higher resolution and faster screen redraw, FX plugin embedding for faster workflow, MIDI CC envelope automation, a graphical patchbay, and performance improvements for projects with 200+ tracks.

Version 7 (2024) added support for track lanes, swipe comping, up to 128 channels of audio per track, and 128 buses for MIDI routing with unlimited audio tracks.

== Licensing ==
REAPER is proprietary software with several perpetual licensing options that include next major version update rights.

== Customization ==
REAPER offers a comprehensive range for multi-track recording and editing, MIDI recording and editing, internal non-realtime downmixing, and track-by-track effects looping. The routing concept eliminates the necessity for dedicated bus, aux, and MIDI tracks, allowing each track to accommodate both audio and MIDI data. Multi-track editing is facilitated through object grouping, analogous to the approach employed in Samplitude. Both individual elements and complete tracks can be grouped. The options for macro customization, allowing users to combine complex function sequences into a macro through a drag-and-drop individual commands and assigning them to the user interface, a keyboard key, a mouse button, or a MIDI/OSC command, according to the user's specifications. Furthermore, REAPER offers an extension API that facilitates deep integration of third-party software within the REAPER environment.

The graphical user interface (GUI) of REAPER can be modified according to the user's preferences through the use of customizable themes. These themes can be created by the user themselves, allowing for a high degree of flexibility in adapting the software to their specific needs. Additionally, the default theme from each previous version of REAPER is included, providing a starting point for users who may not have the time or inclination to create their own themes.

ReaScript allows users to customize REAPER by editing, running, and debugging scripts. This feature supports the creation of personalized themes, the extension of REAPER’s functionality, and the development of advanced macros and comprehensive extensions. Scripts can be written in EEL2 (JSFX/Jesusonic script), Lua, and Python.

ReaPack offers a comprehensive solution for managing and installing extensions sourced from a variety of repositories.

The SWS/S&M extension (founded by Standing Water Studios' Tim Payne) is a widely used open-source extension to REAPER that offers workflow enhancements such as snapshots, marker actions, and advanced tempo/groove manipulation capabilities.

ReaClassical offers a fully open-source environment for classical music editing, featuring source-destination editing, multitrack track-group editing, and a two-lane crossfade editor.

Additionally, REAPER supports multiple languages, with downloadable language packs available. Both users and developers can create their own language packs for REAPER.

== Included software and plug-ins ==
REAPER comes with a variety of commonly used audio production effects. They include tools such as ReaEQ (parametric equalizer), ReaVerb (reverb), ReaGate (audio gate), ReaDelay (delay), ReaPitch (pitch shifting), ReaComp (compression), and ReaTune (automatic tuning of vocals or other audio). The included plug-ins are also accessible as a standalone download for users of other DAWs as the "ReaPlugs VST FX Suite".

Also included are hundreds of JSFX plug-ins ranging from standard effects to specific applications for MIDI and audio. JSFX scripts are editable text files, which when loaded into REAPER (exactly like a VST or other plug-in) become full-featured plugins ranging from simple audio effects (e.g delay, distortion, compression) to instruments (synths, samplers) and other special purpose tools (drum triggering and surround panning).

REAPER includes the instruments ReaSynth, ReaSynDr, and ReaSamplomatic 5000. ReaSynth is a basic synth with wave shape, ADSR Envelope, and Portamento. ReaSynDr has 4 drum samples, a kick, snare, blip, and tick. ReaSamplomatic 5000 is a sampler.

REAPER includes no third-party software but is fully compatible with all versions of the VST standard (currently VST2 and VST3). It can also run AU plugins (on macOS), CLAP plug-ins, DX plugins (on Windows), and LV2 plugins, and thus works with the vast majority of free and commercial plug-ins. REAPER x64 can also run 32-bit plug-ins alongside 64-bit processes. As of version 5.97, REAPER supports ARA 2 plugins.

== Video editing ==
REAPER allows video, audio, MIDI, and still images to be freely combined on any track. REAPER offers the ability to cut and trim video files and edit or replace their audio, and render out to various video formats. It supports common video effects such as fades, wipes, cross-fades, opacity, motion detection, and text titles. Video can be viewed in a separate window while working.

== Control surface support and remote control ==
REAPER has built-in support for:

- BCF2000 – Behringer's motorized faders control surface, USB/MIDI
- TranzPort – Frontier Design Group's wireless transport control
- AlphaTrack – Frontier Design Group's AlphaTrack control surface
- FaderPort – Presonus' FaderPort control surface
- Baby HUI – Mackie's Baby HUI control surface
- MCU – Mackie's "Mackie Control Universal" control surface

REAPER's built-in web control allows control of the software from any other device on the same network, such as a tablet, smartphone, or another computer. REAPER also supports the Open Sound Control (OSC) standard.

== Timeline of Reaper versions ==
- First public release – December 23, 2005 as freeware
- 1.0 – August 23, 2006 as shareware
- 2.0 – October 10, 2007
  - 2.43 – July 30, 2008: Beta Mac OS X and Windows x64 support
  - 2.56 – March 2, 2009: Finalized Mac OS X and Windows x64 ports
- 3.0 – May 22, 2009
- 4.0 – August 3, 2011
  - Work on Linux support began
- 5.0 – August 12, 2015
  - Beta-quality Linux support
  - Support for VST3 plugins
  - 5.20 – May 17, 2016: MIDI notation editor
  - 5.93 – July 17, 2018: First public Linux builds released
- 6.0 – December 3, 2019
  - 6.71 – November 28, 2022: Support for CLAP plugins
- 7.0 – October 16, 2023

== Reception ==
REAPER has been praised for its affordable price tiers, features, versatility, and flexibility, while being criticised for an unintuitive interface and lack of visual appeal.

== See also ==
- Comparison of digital audio editors
- List of digital audio workstation software
- List of music software
