= Vanguard (synthesizer) =

Vanguard was a VSTi and AU software synthesizer created by Canadian independent publisher reFX and Markus Krause from Tone2 Audio.

== Production ==
Released in 2004, Vanguard was a virtual analog synthesizer with three oscillators, 31 waveforms alongside a unison that goes up to 10-voices, a filter with 13 types, delay, and a reverb powered by Freeverb by Jezar Wakefield at Dreampoint Design and Engineering, and stereo pattern controlled trancegate and arpeggiator. Most functions could be automated, such as cutoff frequencies, resonance, ADSR, and LFO. Vanguard worked with any VST-capable host and featured the Trancegate and Arpeggiator tools. A majority of the audio engine was programmed by Markus Krause of Tone2 Audio. The factory presets were made by Manuel Schleis.

== Discontinuation and current use ==
Vanguard was discontinued in 2016. The software can still be downloaded from the reFX website for existing licensed users and can still be played through any DAW that supports 32-bit or 64-bit plugins, namely FL Studio.

Vanguard is used by many electronic dance music producers, despite not remaining as prevalent as reFX's Nexus 4 hybrid synthesizer plugin. Vanguard is considered to be an impressive and straightforward synth amongst many producers.

== Revival ==
On November 25, 2022, reFX announced they had revived the Vanguard synthesizer as Vanguard 2 with an updated vector-based user interface, in addition to 10 new wavetables by Mirko Ruta, 24db ladder filters for lowpass and highpass also made by Mirko Ruta, a new reverb named RutaVerb also by Mirko Ruta replacing the old Freeverb-powered reverb and a distortion effect alongside 136 new factory presets made by Mirko Ruta and other modulation features, such as a new 3rd envelope and a new delay type intended to widen a sound.
