= Goniometer (disambiguation) =

Goniometer may refer to:

- Goniometer, an instrument that measures angles or allows an object to be rotated to a precise angular position
- Positioning goniometer, a device used to rotate an object precisely about a fixed axis in space
- Goniometer (audio), a device that displays the amount of stereo in a dual-channel signal
- The Bellini–Tosi direction finder is also known as a radio goniometer
