= Nexus 2 =

Nexus 2 may refer to:

- Nexus S, the second Google Nexus device.
- Nexus: The Jupiter Incident 2, an attempted Kickstarter game.
- Nexus 2, the ROM-based sampling VST by reFX
