= CLever Audio Plug-in =

Audio interface and effect program

- Original author(s): u-he and Bitwig
- Initial release: 2022; 3 years ago
- Stable release: 1.2.6 / 11 March 2025
- Repository: github.com/free-audio/clap
- Written in: C
- Type: Audio plug-in API
- License: MIT License
- Website: cleveraudio.org

CLever Audio Plug-in or CLAP is an open source software architecture, application programming interface and reference implementation suite for audio effect plugins as used in multimedia software such as digital audio workstations, audio editing software, and video editing software with integrated audio workflows. The specification and reference implementation was released in 2022 by the Berlin-based audio software companies u-he and Bitwig.

CLAP was created as an open licensed alternative to proprietary audio plugin formats such as Steinberg's VST format, Apple's Audio Units format, or Avid Technology's Avid Audio Extension (AAX) format, designed for non-destructive parameter automation, multi-voice envelopes, true MIDI 2.0 support, better multi-core CPU performance and greater ease writing plugins in a non-proprietary licensing framework under the MIT License. CLAP is supported by 15 DAWs and 93 plugin producers who have produced 394 CLAP plugins.

== See also ==
- LADSPA and LV2, similar open-source standards
