= Manuel Schleis =

German music producer

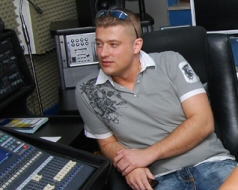
Schleis in 2007

Manuel Schleis (born 1979) is a German music producer and former sound designer. He is best known for publishing the Vengeance sample libraries. Computer Music said in 2020 that Vengeance Essential Clubsounds, Volume 1 would "go down in history as a library that changed the sound of dance music".

== About ==
He worked together with DJ Manuel Reuter (DJ Manian, danceformation Cascada, also Spencer & Hill) and has produced many club hits and remixes for Sugababes, Moby, Scooter (band), Axwell, Public Enemy, and Tiësto. He is also a developer of audio music software as well as being a sound designer. Under the company name "Vengeance-Sound" he releases Soundsets / Sample CDs. As a sound designer for Access Music Electronics, Roland Music, Waldorf synthesizer, Propellerheads, Tone2 & reFX Manuel Schleis works as well. In 2016 his new line of VST Plugins, called "Vengeance Producer Suite", was released (in cooperation with audio software company Keilwerth Audio). Additionally Manuel Schleis works as a tutor for "dance production" for example the "Roland Synth2Sound Tour", "SAE" & "Musikmesse Frankfurt".

Starting 2014, Schleis has abandoned making EDM tracks, to focus on his passion of producing soundsets with recorded samples only.

== Sound Design ==
=== Sampling CDs/DVDs ===
Manuel has done over 50 sampling CD's as Vengeance Sound, along with various other producers. Several of these packs include:

- Vengeance Analog Drums Vol.1
- Vengeance Dance Explosion Vol.1
- Vengeance Dance Explosion Vol.2
- Vengeance Deep House Vol.1
- Vengeance Deep House Vol.2
- Vengeance Dirty Electro Vol.1
- Vengeance Dirty Electro Vol.2
- Vengeance Dirty Electro Vol.3
- Vengeance EDM Essentials Vol.1
- Vengeance EDM Essentials Vol.2
- Vengeance Effects Vol.1
- Vengeance Effects Vol.2
- Vengeance Effects Vol.3
- Vengeance Electro Essentials Vol.1
- Vengeance Electro Essentials Vol.2
- Vengeance Electro Essentials Vol.3
- Vengeance Essential Clubsounds Vol.1
- Vengeance Essential Clubsounds Vol.2
- Vengeance Essential Clubsounds Vol.3
- Vengeance Essential Clubsounds Vol.4
- Vengeance Essential Clubsounds Vol.5
- Vengeance Essential Deep House
- Vengeance Essential Dubstep Vol.1
- Vengeance Essential Dubstep Vol.2
- Vengeance Essential House Vol.1
- Vengeance Essential House Vol.2
- Vengeance Essential House Vol.3
- Vengeance Essential House Vol.4
- Vengeance Freakz On Beatz Vol.1
- Vengeance Freakz On Beatz Vol.2
- Vengeance Freakz On Beatz Vol.3
- Vengeance Future House Vol.1
- Vengeance Future House Vol.2
- Vengeance Future House Vol.3
- Vengeance Future House Vol.4
- Vengeance Minimal House
- Vengeance Minimal House Vol.2
- Vengeance Pop Essentials Vol.1
- Vengeance Pop Essentials Vol.2
- Vengeance Rhythm Guitars Vol.1
- Vengeance Rhythm Guitars Vol.2
- Vengeance Freakz On Beatz Vol.1
- Vengeance Freakz On Beatz Vol.2
- Vengeance Freakz On Beatz Vol.3
- Vengeance Trance Sensation Vol.1
- Vengeance Trance Sensation Vol.2
- Vengeance Trance Sensation Vol.3
- Vengeance Trance Sensation Vol.4
- Vengeance Total Dance Sounds Vol.1
- Vengeance Total Dance Sounds Vol.2
- Vengeance Total Dance Sounds Vol.3
- Vengeance Ultimate Bass
- Vengeance Vocal Essentials Vol.1
- Vengeance Vocal Essentials Vol.2
- Vengeance Electroshock Vol.1
- Vengeance Electroshock Vol.2
- Vengeance Studio Vocals Vol.1
- Vengeance Trap Essentials Vol.1
- Vengeance Ultimate Fills Vol.1
- Vengeance Ultimate Fills Vol.2
- Vengeance Ultimate Fills Vol.3
- reFX Nexus1, Nexus2, Nexus3, Nexus4 & Nexus5

Nexus 1, 2, 3, 4 & 5 are sample-based synthesizers (rompler) that, according to ReFX themselves, are actually more than just romplers.

=== Soundsets For Hardware/Software Synthesizers ===
- Trance Source X (Access - all Virus models)
- Incubation V1 (Access - all Virus models)
- Incubation V2 (A - all Virus models)
- Incubation V3 (Access - all Virus models)
- Trance Source 2001 (Access - all Virus models)
- Vengeance Virus TI Factory Bank (Access - Virus Ti)
- CS2x Sounds (Yamaha - CS2x)
- Vanguard Vengeance-Sound Factory Presets (reFX - Vanguard)
- Vanguard Soundset Part II (reFX - Vanguard)
- Gladiator Vengeance-Sound Factory Presets (Tone2 - Gladiator)
- Vengeance-Forum Soundset Vol.1 (Novation - V-Station)
- Vengeance-Forum Soundset Vol.2 (reFX - Vanguard)
- Vengeance-Forum Combfusion Soundset Vol.1 (Propellerheads - Reason)
- Vengeance-Forum Combfusion Soundset Vol.2 (Propellerheads - Reason)
- X-plorations Vol.1 (Roland - JP8000/JP8080)
- X-plorations Vol.2 (Roland - JP8000/JP8080)
- X-plorations Vol.3 (Roland - JP8000/JP8080)
- Blue Magic (Novation - Supernova 2, Supernova 1, Nova Laptop)
- Analog Meltdown (Waldorf - Pulse/Pulse+)
- Nordish by Nature (Clavia - Nordlead III)
- Trance & Dance Soundset for A1 (Cubase - A1)
- Cosmic X (Yamaha - CS6x/CS6r incl. PLG150AN)
- Q - Trilogy Vol.1 (Waldorf - Q+, Q, MicroQ/Komplexer)
- Q - Trilogy Vol.2 (Waldorf - Q+, Q, MicroQ/Komplexer)
- Club 4k part I - V-Station (Novation - V-Station)
- Club 4k part II - V-Station (Novation - V-Station)
- Analog Essentials (TC Powercore - Powercore 01)
- Prophecy (Native Instruments - Pro 53)
- Discovery Soundset Vol.1 (DiscoDSP - Discovery)
- Discovery (Pro) Soundset Vol.2 (DiscoDSP - Discovery Pro)
- Korg Legacy Soundset (Korg - Legacy Collection)
- Oddity Mini-Bass Soundset (GMedia - Oddity)
- Vengeance THOR Soundset (Reason 4.0 - THOR)
- Digital Atmosphere (Korg - Legacy Collection Digital Edition)
- Vengeance Electro Soundset for Massive (Native Instruments - Massive)
- Vengeance Moog Electrobass (Arturia - Minimoog V v2.0.1)
- Vengeance Producer Suite: Metrum Expansion 1 - Factory Extension
- Vengeance Producer Suite: Metrum Expansion 2 - Ultimate HipHop
- Vengeance Producer Suite: Metrum Expansion 3 - Future Kicks
- Vengeance Producer Suite: Metrum Expansion 4 - Blutonium Boy
- Vengeance Producer Suite: Metrum Expansion 5 - Electro House
- Vengeance Producer Suite: Metrum Expansion 6 - Hands Up Kicks

=== VST Plugins ===
- Vengeance Producer Suite: Multiband Sidechain
- Vengeance Producer Suite: Metrum
- Vengeance Mastering Suite: Multiband Compressor
- Vengeance Producer Suite: Philta XL
- Vengeance Mastering Suite: Stereo Bundle
- Vengeance Producer Suite: Essential FX Bundle
- Vengeance Producer Suite: Phalanx
- Vengeance Producer Suite: Tape Stop
- Vengeance Producer Suite: Glitch Bitch
- Vengeance Producer Suite: Avenger
- reFX Nexus 1
- reFX Nexus 2
- reFX Nexus 3
- reFX Nexus 4
- reFX Nexus 5
- reFX QuadraSID
- reFX PlastiCZ
- reFX Vanguard

== Discography ==
=== Releases (selection) ===
- 2003 Icarus - All Systems Go! / Extension Records
- 2003 Phalanx - Flaming Skies / Illuminate Records
- 2003 Ampire - Singularity / Overdose Records
- 2003 Marc Jerome - Shake it / Everlasting Records
- 2004 Reuter & Schleis - Passion / Alphabet City
- 2004 Floorburner - Get Ready / DJ INC Records
- 2004 Spoot - Take Control 2004 / Media Records
- 2004 Kareema - Cool your Engines / Kontor Records
- 2005 Aramanja - Memories / Waterworld Rec.
- 2005 Denga & Manus - Cenwen / Asgard Records
- 2005 Floorburner - Everybody Dance-Heaven / Yawa Recording
- 2005 Spencer & Hill - Spencer & Hill EP vol.2 / Star Rouge Records
- 2005 Scarf! - Hithouse One / Andorfine Records
- 2005 Party Pimpz - Holiday / Aqualoop Records
- 2006 Slice and Case - Abgedreht / Submental-ZYX
- 2006 Phalanx - Symphony in Gminor / Illuminate Records
- 2006 Ampire - Speedlimit / Traffic Tunes Records
- 2007 Volition - Dimensions / Somatic Sense
- 2007 Spencer & Hill - Get it On / Kontor
- 2007 Em Slice vs Denga - So Sexy / Global Players Records
- 2007 V-Headz - Paxi Fixi / Superstar-Chickenwings
- 2007 Denga & Manus - E-Clipse / Red Silver Recordings
- 2008 A-Lee feat. Amanda Wilson - Gotta Let Go / Oxyd Records
- 2008 Culture Beat - Your Love / Superstar Records
- 2008 Lowrider - Cool / Zooland Records
- 2008 Vengeance - Temptation / Armada / ASOT
- 2008 Spencer & Hill - Da Housebeat / Tiger Records
- 2009 Vengeance - Dawn of the Uprising / Armada / ASOT
- 2009 Spencer & Hill feat Dave Darell - Its a Smash / Zooland Records
- 2009 Dabruck & Klein feat Michael Feines - The Feeling / WePlay

=== Remixes (selection) ===
- 2004 Klubbingman - Magic Summernight (Cascada vs Plazmatek Remix) / Sony Music
- 2004 4 Strings - Turn it Around (Manyou Remix) / Alphabet City
- 2004 Alphazone - Revelation (Phalanx Remix) / Nukleuz UK
- 2004 Groove Coverage - Runaway (DJ Manian Remix) / Zeitgeist-Polydor
- 2004 Pulsedriver - Slamming (Tune Up! Remix) / Aqualoop Records
- 2004 Blank & Jones - Flowtation (Phalanx Remix) / Kontor Records
- 2005 DJ Dean - Kick Da Bass (Ampire Remix) / Tunnel Records
- 2005 DJ Shog - Jealousy (Denga & Manus Remix) / Logport Recordings
- 2005 Lazard - Little Star (Cascada Remix) / Pultrance Rec.
- 2006 Dumonde - Tomorrow 2006 (Observer & DJ Spacecase Remix) / F8T Records
- 2006 Michael Gray - Borderline (Spencer & Hill Remix) / Eye Industries
- 2006 Armand van Helden - Funk Phenomena 2k6Rmx / Submental Rec.
- 2006 Ian Carey - Say What You Want (Spencer & Hill Remix) / KickFresh
- 2006 Above & Beyond - For All I Care (Spencer & Hill Remix) / Anjunabeats
- 2007 Scooter - Behind the Cow (Spencer & Hill Remix) / Kontor
- 2007 Yanou feat. Edwyn Collins - A Girl Like You (S&H Project Remix) / Zooland Records
- 2007 Liz Kay - When Love Becomes a Lie (Kareema Remix) / Zooland Records
- 2007 Tiesto - Carpe Noctum (Spencer & Hill Remix) / Ultra Records
- 2007 Yanou - King of My Castle (Spencer&Hill Remix) / Zooland Records
- 2007 Hi Tack - Lets Dance (Dabruck & Klein Remix) / Superstar Rec.
- 2007 Goodwill and Thommy Trah - Its a swede thing (Dabruck & Klein Remix) / Superstar Rec.
- 2007 Noel Sinner - Pullover (Dabruck & Klein Remix) / Superstar Rec.
- 2007 Eyerer & Chopstick - Make my Day (Dabruck & Klein Remix) / Superstar Rec.
- 2007 Erick Morillo ft. P. Diddy - Dance I said (Spencer&Hil Remix) / OXYD Records
- 2007 Axwell - Its true (Dabruck & Klein Remix) / Superstar Rec.
- 2007 Yanou - Sun is Shining (Spencer & Hill Remix) / Zooland Records
- 2008 Cascada - What Do You Want From Me (Spencer & Hill Remix) / Zooland Records
- 2008 Moby - Disco Lies (Spencer & Hill Remix)
- 2008 Public Enemy vs Benny Benassi - Bring the Noise (Dabruck & Klein Remix) / Superstar Rec.
- 2008 Lorie - Play (Spencer & Hill Remix) / SonyBMG/Columbia
- 2009 Paul van Dyk - For an Angel 2009 (Spencer & Hill Remix) / Vandit
- 2009 Bob Sinclair feat. Sugarhill Gang - La La Song (Spencer & Hill Remix) / Vandetta
- 2009 Dennis the Menace, Bigworld - The First Rebirth (Dabruck & Klein Remix) / Axtone Rec.
- 2009 Royksopp - The Girl and the Robot (Spencer & Hill Remix) / EMI France
