= Audio editing software =

Computer system for manipulating audio

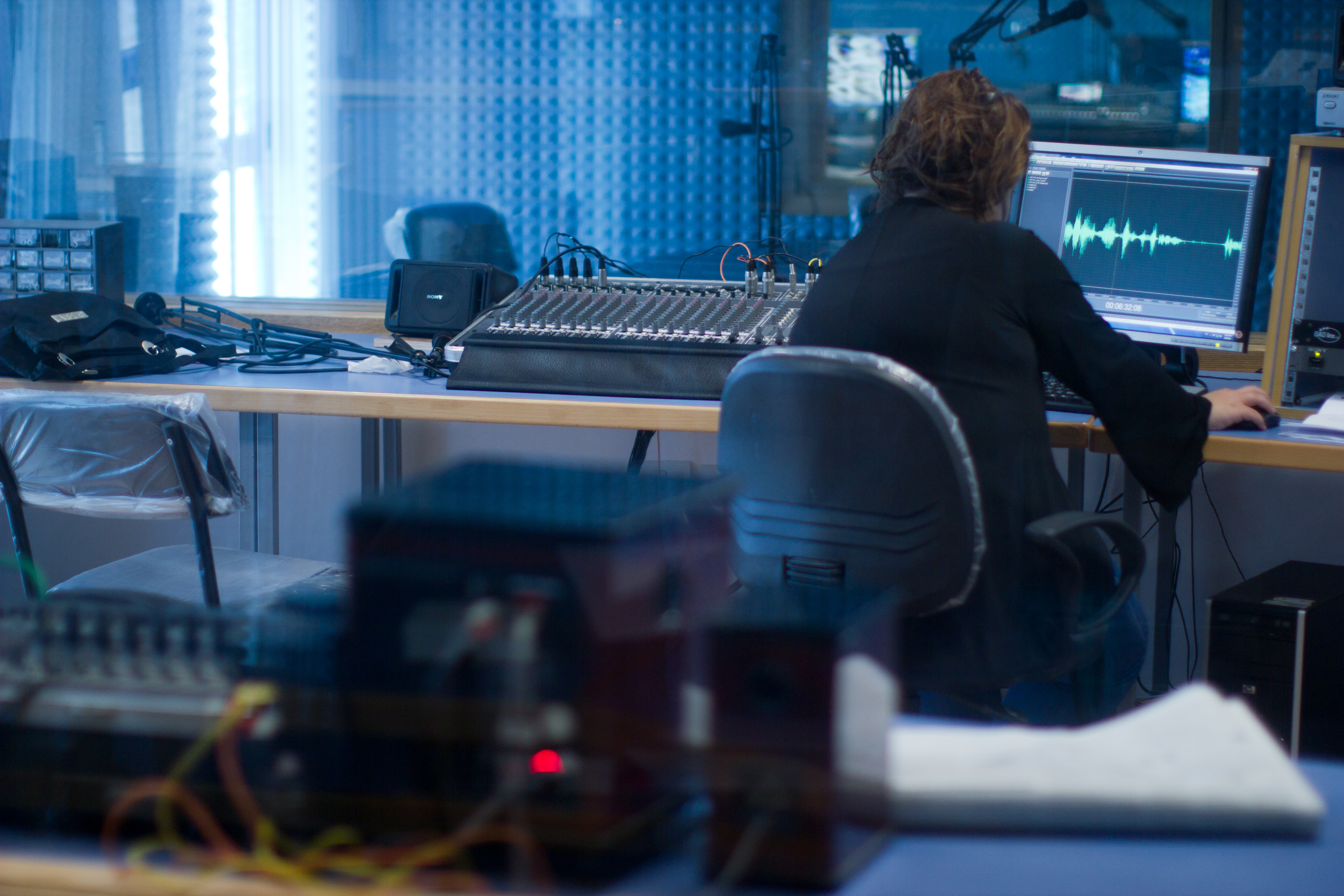
An audio production facility at An-Najah National University

Audio editing software is any software or computer program which allows editing and generating audio data. Audio editing software can be implemented completely or partly as a library, as a computer application, as a web application, or as a loadable kernel module. Wave editors are digital audio editors. There are many sources of software available to perform this function. Most can edit music, apply effects and filters, and adjust stereo channels.

A digital audio workstation (DAW) is software-based and typically comprises multiple software suite components, all accessible through a unified graphical user interface. DAWs are used for recording or producing music, sound effects and more.

== Music software capabilities ==
Audio editing software typically offer the following features:

- The ability to import and export various audio file formats for editing.
- Record audio from one or more inputs and store recordings in the computer's memory as digital audio.
- Edit the start time, stop time, and duration of any sound on the audio timeline.
- Fade into or out of a clip (e.g. an S-fade out during applause after a performance), or between clips (e.g. crossfading between takes).
- Mix multiple sound sources/tracks, combine them at various volume levels and pan from channel to channel to one or more output tracks
- Apply simple or advanced effects or filters, including amplification, normalization, limiting, panning, compression, expansion, flanging, reverb, audio noise reduction, and equalization to change the audio.
- Playback sound (often after being mixed) that can be sent to one or more outputs, such as speakers, additional processors, or a recording medium
- Conversion between different audio file formats, or between different sound quality levels.

Typically these tasks can be performed in a manner that is non-linear. Audio editors may process the audio data non-destructively in real-time, or destructively as an "off-line" process, or a hybrid with some real-time effects and some offline effects.

== Plug-ins ==
Audio plug-ins are small software programs that can be "plugged in" to use inside the main workstation. Plug-ins are used in DAWs to allow more capabilities when it comes to audio editing. There are several different types of plug-ins. For example, stock plug-ins are the plug-ins that come already installed with a DAW, and Virtual Studio Technology (VST) plug-ins. Invented by Steinberg, VST plug-ins allow producers to apply simple or advanced effects such as filters, limiting, compression, reverb, flanging, panning, noise reduction, and equalizers.

== MIDI vs. audio ==
MIDI (pronounced "middy") and audio are both compressed digital formats that are used within a Digital Audio Workspace (DAW). MIDI stands for Musical Instrument Digital Interface. MIDI is used with plug-ins that allow the user to control the notes of various plug-in instruments. MIDI is universally accepted and if one plug-in or synthesizer is used using MIDI, then it can be modified with another synthesizer. The filename extension of MIDI format is .MIDI or .MID. Unlike MIDI, Digital audio contains a recording of sound. Audio files are a lot larger than MIDI files, and while MIDI is smaller, MIDI can have variations from the original sounds.

== List of DAWs ==
See Digital audio workstation § Notable commercial examples and Comparison of digital audio editors

== Comparison of destructive and real-time editing ==
Destructive editing modifies the data of the original audio file, as opposed to just editing its playback parameters. Destructive editors are also known as sample editors. Destructive editing applies edits and processing directly to the audio data, changing the data immediately. If, for example, part of a track is deleted, the deleted audio data is immediately removed from that part of the track.

Real-time editing does not apply changes immediately but applies edits and processing on the fly during playback. If, for example, part of a track is deleted, the deleted audio data is not actually removed from the track, but is hidden and will be skipped on playback.

=== Advantages of destructive editing ===
- In graphical editors, every change to the audio is usually visible immediately as the visible waveform is updated to match the audio data.
- The number of effects that may be applied is virtually unlimited (though may be limited by disk space available for "undo" data).
- Editing is usually precise down to exact sample intervals.
- Effects may be applied to a precisely specified selected region.
- Mixing down or exporting the edited audio is usually relatively quick as little additional processing is required.

=== Limitations of destructive editing ===
- Once an effect has been applied, it cannot usually be changed. This is usually mitigated by the ability to "undo" the last performed action. Typically a destructive audio editor will maintain many levels of "undo history" so that multiple actions may be undone in the reverse order that they were applied.
- Edits can only be undone in the reverse order that they were applied (undoing the most recent edit first).

=== Advantages of non-destructive (real-time) editing ===
- Effects can usually be adjusted during playback, or at any other time.
- Edits may be undone or adjusted at any time in any order.
- Multiple effects and edits may be 'stacked' so that they are applied to the audio as an effect chain.
- A stack of effects may be changed so that effects are applied in a different order, or effects inserted or removed from the chain.
- Some real-time editors support effect automation so that changes to effect parameters may be programmed to occur at specified times during audio playback.

=== Limitations of non-destructive (real-time) editing ===
- The waveform may not show the effect of processing until the audio has been rendered to another track.
- The number of effects that may be applied is limited by the available processing power of the computer or editing hardware. In some editors, this may be mitigated by rendering to another track.
- It may not be possible to have an effect only on part of a track. Applying a real-time effect to part of a track usually requires that the effect is set to turn on at one point and turn off at another.
- In multi-track editors, if audio is copied or moved from one track to another, the audio in the new track may sound different from how it sounded in the original track as there may be different real-time effects in each track.
- In some applications, mixing down or exporting the edited audio may be slow as all effects and processing need to be applied.

== See also ==
- Audio signal processing
- Comparison of digital audio editors
- Comparison of free software for audio
- List of music software
- Music sequencer
- Software effect processor
- Software synthesizer
