= ValhallaDSP =

Digital reverberator and delay plugin company

- Industry: Audio plug-ins
- Founded: 2009
- Founder: Sean Costello; Kristin Costello
- Website: valhalladsp.com

ValhallaDSP is a digital audio signal processing software company that makes reverberator and delay plugins.

== History ==
ValhallaDSP as a company was founded by Sean Costello, who handles coding. Kristin Costello handles graphics and marketing.

Sean Costello has always been interested in the interaction between musicians and the academic and professional worlds. He has co-written academic papers about reverberation, including a 2009 paper about using algorithmic reverberation with the Ambisonics system and a paper about implementing a digital simulation of a spring reverb.

ValhallaDSP was founded in 2009; Sean worked as an audio DSP designer and consultant for about a decade before founding his own company. Before Valhalla DSP, Sean Costello had his first plugin work made public when he provided four reverb algorithms for the Audio Damage EOS reverb plugin which was initially released in 2009; one of those four algorithms was not available until 2017, when Audio Damage released EOS 2.

Don Gunn has helped Sean Costello with R&D/preset design for ValhallaDSP's plugins.

== Products ==
ValhallaDSP makes a combination of reverb, delay, and sound effect plugins.

=== Reverbs ===
==== Valhalla Room ====
Valhalla Room is a reverb plugin which mainly simulates the acoustics of realistic rooms and halls, although it can also be used for special effects. It has 12 different algorithms. One review felt that, while Valhalla Room sounds really good, it sounds more "hyper-real and lush" than "gritty and realistic". They also felt that its user interface could use some improvement.

==== Valhalla Vintage Verb ====
Valhalla Vintage Verb is a plugin with the sounds of various late 1970s and 1980s digital reverberators, including ones which sound like Lexicon and EMT reverbs. This plugin has been used song such as Hello and Water Under the Bridge by Adele, as well as on Lana Del Rey's album "Lust for Life". One review feels that while it is excellent for getting the unreal larger than life sound of a classic Lexicon reverb, it does not work as a subtle reverb effect and is not a reverb for every occasion.

==== Valhalla Plate ====
Valhalla Plate is a plug in which simulates the sound of a plate reverb or small chamber. It has 12 different algorithms.

Third party reviews of Valhalla Plate have been generally positive, but one review pointed out that "it won't serve all needs", since it only simulates plates and small chambers, and does not emulate larger spaces.

==== Valhalla Supermassive ====
Valhalla Supermassive is an effect unit which can run various types of delays and reverbs; it is good at, among other things, emulating large spaces. It is a free download.

=== Delays and sound effects ===
These plugins provide a combination of delay, sound effect, and reverberation effects.

==== Valhalla ÜberMod ====
Valhalla ÜberMod is a plugin which is geared towards delay effects, but can also create reverberant effects.

==== Valhalla Shimmer ====
Valhalla Shimmer provides a combination of reverberation and pitch shifting, inspired by the sound of some 1980s Brian Eno and Daniel Lanois collaborations.

==== Valhalla Freq Echo ====
Primary a sound effect, the free Valhalla Freq Echo plugin provides a combination of delay and a Bode frequency shifter. This is mainly for making unusual sounds.

==== Valhalla Space Modulator ====
Valhalla Space Modulator is a plugin, free with the purchase of any other ValhallaDSP plugin, which simulates some kinds of flanging and pitch shift effects.

==== Valhalla Delay ====
Valhalla Delay is a plugin which simulates the sounds of a number of vintage delays, including tape based delays (such as the sound of Roland Space Echo, Maestro Echoplex, or reel to reel based tape delay units), "bucket brigade" delays, 1980s digital delays, and delays with pitch shifting. It features a "ghost" mode which combines delay with frequency shifting.

This plugin can do both classic delay sounds and unusual sound effects.

Valhalla Delay is on Music Radar's list of five best plugins released in 2019, and they consider it the best delay plugin in 2020.

== See also ==
- Reverberation
- Delay (audio effect)
