= TiMidity++ =

Software synthesizer

- Developer: Masanao Izumo et al.
- Stable release: 2.15.0 / 29 August 2018; 7 years ago
- Repository: [cvs://anonymous@cvs.sourceforge.net:/cvsroot/timidity cvs://anonymous@cvs.sourceforge.net:/cvsroot/timidity]
- Written in: C
- Operating system: Cross-platform
- Type: software synthesizer
- License: GPL-2.0-or-later
- Website: sourceforge.net/projects/timidity

TiMidity++, originally and still frequently informally called TiMidity, is a software synthesizer that can play MIDI files without a hardware synthesizer. It can either render to the sound card in real time, or it can save the result to a file, such as a PCM .wav file.

TiMidity++ primarily runs under Linux and Unix-like operating systems, but it also runs under Microsoft Windows and AmigaOS. Distributed under the GPL-2.0-or-later, TiMidity++ is free software.

== Features ==
TiMidity++ can read a number of file types and devices, primarily the ordinary .mid files, but also .kar (MIDI with Karaoke lyrics), Recomposer files, and module files. It is one of the few programs that can read MIDI .mid files using the MIDI Tuning Standard. TiMidity++ also has support for SoundFonts, rendering the synthesized MIDI sounds into their recorded SoundFont equivalents and directing the output to the soundcard. Files can be fetched from standard input, files, archive files, or from the network (over HTTP, FTP or NNTP).

The program has various interfaces, including but not limited to bare text, ncurses, X11 (Motif, Xaw, GTK+ and Tk) and even an Emacs interface that shows played notes in real time.

TiMidity++ has some support for microtonal music.

== History ==
The original version of TiMidity was written in 1995 by Tuukka Toivonen. After he stopped updating the program, Masanao Izumo and other contributors started to work on the program, renaming it to TiMidity++.

== See also ==
- FluidSynth
- WildMIDI
