= SFZ (file format) =

Plain text file format for storing instrument data for software synthesizers

SFZ file format
- Filename extension: .sfz
- Developed by: René Ceballos
- Type of format: Markup language

SFZ is a plain text file format that stores instrument data for sampled instruments. The SFZ format was developed by René Ceballos (founder of rgcaudio) and continues to be used by companies such as Cakewalk, Plogue and Garritan. SFZ is a royalty-free format and can be used by software developers for both free and commercial purposes. The SFZ Format is widely accepted as an open standard to define the behavior of a musical instrument from a bare set of sound recordings.

Similar file formats are the open Decent Sampler format (.dspreset) and the proprietary format used by Native Instruments Kontakt (.nki, .nkm).

A simple example of an SFZ file:

<group>
lovel=0
hivel=127

<region> trigger=attack  pitch_keycenter=60 lokey=30 hikey=61 sample=SubDir/01C4.wav
<region> trigger=attack  pitch_keycenter=62 lokey=62 hikey=63 sample=SubDir/02D4.wav
<region> trigger=attack  pitch_keycenter=64 lokey=64 hikey=64 sample=SubDir/03E4.wav
<region> trigger=attack  pitch_keycenter=65 lokey=65 hikey=66 sample=SubDir/04F4.wav
<region> trigger=attack  pitch_keycenter=67 lokey=67 hikey=68 sample=SubDir/05G4.wav
<region> trigger=attack  pitch_keycenter=69 lokey=69 hikey=70 sample=SubDir/06A4.wav
<region> trigger=attack  pitch_keycenter=71 lokey=71 hikey=71 sample=SubDir/07B4.wav
<region> trigger=attack  pitch_keycenter=72 lokey=72 hikey=73 sample=SubDir/08C5.wav
<region> trigger=attack  pitch_keycenter=74 lokey=74 hikey=75 sample=SubDir/09D5.wav
<region> trigger=attack  pitch_keycenter=76 lokey=76 hikey=108 sample=SubDir/10E5.wav

The SFZ format isn't maintained by a single company or group, and supported features can vary between individual synthesizers. The official page at the Cakewalk web-site is no longer available, however descriptions of the SFZ opcodes can be found on various websites.

Applications exist that provide a point-and-click GUI for creating SFZ files, as an alternative to editing the text directly.

== See also ==
- DLS format
- SoundFont
