= SAWStudio =

Digital audio workstation

- Developer: RML Labs
- Stable release: 5.7 / January 5, 2019
- Operating system: Microsoft Windows
- Type: Digital audio workstation
- License: Proprietary
- Website: www.SAWStudio.com

SAWStudio is a digital audio workstation (DAW) developed by RML Labs. It is the latest incarnation in the SAW line of software.

SAW is the acronym for Software Audio Workshop. SAW was one of the first DAW products available for Microsoft Windows at a time when Pro Tools for the Apple Macintosh computer had virtually 100% industry market share. SAW's lower price appealed to budget-minded professionals, and SAW quickly found use in production and post-production studios. It was especially popular in the television industry in the early 1990s, often being packaged with a DAL CardD+ sound card and a Music Quest MXQ-32 MIDI interface for a turnkey, SMPTE-syncable 'CD quality' (16bit, 44.1 kHz sampling rate, full-duplex) system.

SAW is unique among DAWs in that its engine bypasses much of the Windows kernel, with most of the program written in assembly language. This produces code that, even though maintained as a full-featured DAW, results in an executable file that is less than 2 megabytes in size, with its graphics DLL file accounts for most of the program's size. SAW retains a cult following and its user interface is praised by its userbase, but criticized by others, which has limited the software's ability to penetrate what has become a highly competitive market. Proponents of SAW extol its speed and reliability (infrequent crashing) in particular.
