= Bitwig Studio =

Digital audio workstation

- Developer: Bitwig GmbH
- Release: 26 March 2014; 12 years ago
- Stable release: 6.0.11 / 2 July 2026; 31 days ago
- Written in: C++, Java
- Operating system: Microsoft Windows, macOS, Linux
- Type: Digital audio workstation
- License: Proprietary
- Website: www.bitwig.com

Bitwig Studio is a proprietary digital audio workstation developed by Bitwig GmbH. Bitwig is available for Linux, macOS, and Windows. Bitwig is designed to be an instrument for live performances as well as a tool for composing, recording, arranging, mixing, and mastering. It offers a suite of controls for beatmatching, crossfading, and other effects used by turntablists. Bitwig supports both traditional linear music arrangement and non-linear (clip-based) production. It has multi-monitor and touch screen support. Bitwig is notable for its strong modulation and automation capabilities.

In 2017, Bitwig Studio was named DAW of the year by Computer Music magazine. In 2023 it was named DAW of the year by Future Music magazine and Music Radar magazine.

== History ==
Bitwig was founded and developed in Berlin by Claes Johanson, Pablo Sara, Nicholas Allen and Volker Schumacher in 2009. Since 2010, Placidus Schelbert has been the CEO after he left his position as an International Sales Manager at Ableton, in the same year.

In 2022, Bitwig added a new "Spectral Suite" range of effects containers behind a paywall, against their sales agreement with customers that Bitwig would not introduce additional purchases beyond its annual update fee. This caused outrage among its community, causing them to add the range to the then-upcoming Bitwig Studio 4.4 at no cost, and offer refunds to those who had purchased the range.

In 2022, Bitwig GmbH was one of the main sponsors for a new audio plug-in interface, CLAP.

In 2023, Bitwig and competitor PreSonus collaborated on .dawproject, an open file format to facilitate migration of projects between different Digital Audio Workstations.

== Features ==
The flexible modulation system allows to dynamically influence nearly every parameter in a sample-accurate manner, even across tracks. Hybrid Tracks allow for the simultaneous editing of MIDI and Audio Data on the same track,

The modular architecture of the software ensures a high degree of stability: Should a plugin or the audio-engine crash, they can be restarted separately, without compromising the project.

The DAW provides extensive support for controlling external hardware using CV or MIDI, including direct output via an Audio interface. Modern Standards like MPE are fully covered.

An open Controller-API allows freely configurable hardware mapping and customization of most MIDI controllers.

Bitwig Studio includes features such as automatic latency compensation, tabbed opening of multiple projects, configurable routing, and drag-and-drop transfer of elements between projects.

The included stock instruments and effects can be expanded using CLAP and VST Plugins.

Bitwig Studio is one of the few commercial DAWs which support Linux as well as Windows and MacOS. Three editions of the software are available, listed here in ascending order based on the number of features: Bitwig Studio Essentials, Bitwig Studio Producer, and Bitwig Studio.

== Major version & release history ==
Release History
Version	Date
6.0	11 March 2026
5.3	19 February 2025
5.2	25 April 2024
5.1	06 December 2023
5.0	29 June 2023
4.4	11 October 2022
4.3	11 May 2022
4.2	10 March 2022
4.1	25 November 2021
4.0	14 July 2021
3.3	27 November 2020
3.2	04 June 2020
3.1	18 December 2019
3.0	10 July 2019
2.5	03 May 2019
2.4	19 September 2018
2.3	01 March 2018
2.2	12 October 2017
2.1	16 May 2017
2.0	02 March 2017
1.3	12 November 2015
1.2	22 October 2015
1.1	25 November 2014
1.0	26 March 2014

== See also ==
- Ableton Live
- List of music software
