= Audio plug-in =

Software signal processor or synthesizer module

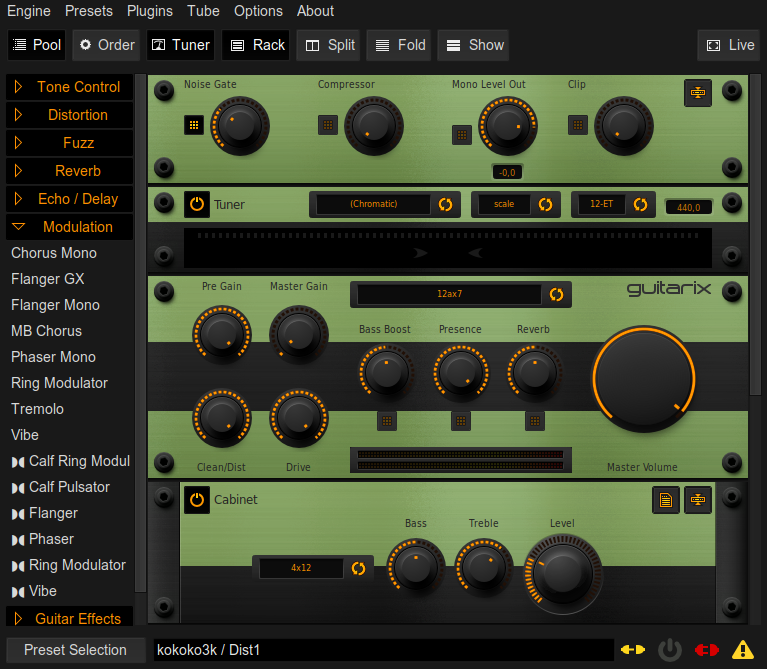
Screenshot of the guitar amplifier plugin software Guitarix

In computer software, an audio plug-in is a plug-in that can add or enhance audio-related functions in a computer program, typically a digital audio workstation. Such functions may include digital signal processing or sound synthesis. Audio plug-ins usually provide their own user interface, which often contains graphical user interface (GUI) widgets that can be used to control and visualize the plug-in's audio parameters.

== Types ==
There are three broad classes of audio plug-in: those which transform existing audio samples, those which generate new audio samples through sound synthesis, and those which analyze existing audio samples. Although all plug-in types can technically perform audio analysis, only specific formats provide a mechanism for analysis data to be returned to the host.

== Instances ==
The program used to dynamically load audio plug-ins is called a plug-in host. Example hosts include Bidule, Gig Performer, Mainstage, REAPER, and Sonic Visualiser. Plug-ins can also be used to host other plug-ins. Communication between host and plug-in(s) is determined by a plug-in application programming interface (API). The API declares functions and data structures that the plug-in must define to be usable by a plug-in host. Additionally, a functional specification may be provided, which defines how the plug-in should respond to function calls, and how the host should expect to handle function calls to the plug-in. The specification may also include documentation about the meaning of variables and data structures declared in the API. The API header files, specification, shared libraries, license, and documentation are sometimes bundled together in a software development kit (SDK).

== List of plug-in architectures ==
Name	Developer	License	GUI support	Supported types	Supported platforms	Supported DAWs
Rack Extension	Reason Studios	BSD-style	Yes	Transformation, synthesis	macOS, Windows	Reason
Virtual Studio Technology	Steinberg	Proprietary or MIT	Yes	Transformation, synthesis	Linux, macOS, Windows	(Most DAWs)
Audio Units	Apple	Proprietary	Yes	Transformation, synthesis	iOS, macOS, tvOS	(Most DAWs on Apple Software)
Real Time AudioSuite	Avid	Proprietary	Yes	Transformation, synthesis	macOS, Windows	Pro Tools (32-bit only)
Avid Audio eXtension	Avid	Proprietary	Yes	Transformation, synthesis	macOS, Windows	Pro Tools
TDM	Avid	Proprietary	Yes	Transformation, synthesis	macOS, Windows	Pro Tools (32-bit only)
LADSPA	ladspa.org	LGPL	No	Transformation	Linux, macOS, Windows	Ardour, LMMS
DSSI	Free software	LGPL, BSD	Yes	Transformation, synthesis	Linux, macOS, Windows	Qtractor, Renoise
LV2	lv2plug.in	ISC	Yes	Transformation, synthesis	Linux, macOS, Windows	Ardour, REAPER
DirectX plugin	Microsoft	Proprietary	Yes	Transformation, synthesis	Windows	ACID Pro (v3.0 or later), Adobe Audition, Cakewalk Sonar (v2.0 or later), MAGIX Samplitude, REAPER, Sound Forge, Steinberg (Wavelab, Nuendo, Cubase), OpenMPT
VAMP	vamp-plugins.org	BSD-style	No	Analysis	Linux, macOS, Windows	Audacity
CLAP	Bitwig and others	MIT-style	Yes	Transformation, synthesis	Linux, macOS, Windows	Bitwig, REAPER, FL Studio, MultitrackStudio, MuLab, QTractor
Audio Random Access	Celemony Software	BSD-style			macOS, Windows	Melodyne

== Notable audio plug-in companies ==
- Eventide, Inc
- FabFilter
- iZotope
- Native Instruments
- Neural DSP
- Solid State Logic
- Universal Audio
- ValhallaDSP
- Waves Audio
- Xfer Records

== See also ==
- Effects unit
- Software effect processor
