= Goniometer (audio) =

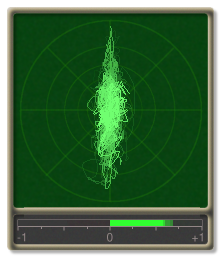
A software goniometer

A goniometer is often included in analog audio equipment to display a Lissajous figure which shows the amount of stereo (that is, phase differences) in a dual-channel signal. It allows the sound technician to adjust for optimal stereo and determine the makeup of errors such as an inverted signal. Many goniometers also provide a VU or PPM as a secondary function. A goniometer adapted for surround metering is called a 'jellyfish display'. This term was coined by DK-Technologies A/S from Denmark.

== Function ==
Its function is to plot a signal on a two-dimensional area so that the correlation between the two axes (audio channels, or phases) becomes apparent.

The channels are plotted on diagonal axes; a left-channel-only signal would form a diagonal line running top-left to bottom-right and a right-channel-only signal would form the opposite diagonal running top-right to bottom-left. A signal on both channels would provide components on both axes and thus expand the plot into two dimensions: a mono signal would produce a straight line angled according to balance; whereas a stereo signal, being asymmetrical, would produce a highly volatile image with a concentration of lines towards the center of the goniometer (see image).

An audio technician would typically begin a session by adjusting the equipment (usually with a 1 kHz mono tone) so that the output produces a vertical plot line. If one channel were phase-inverted, it would result in the plot line being a horizontal instead of vertical, a sure sign of problems. As for mono signals, a half-inverted signal would be reduced to (near) silence.

The persistence of a CRT display is a desired effect on goniometers because the signal display is very dynamic, and the overall shape or envelope of the signal is the object of interest. In fact, good digital and software goniometers provide artificial and even user-adjustable persistence.

The goniometer proves useful because it provides very dense information in an analog and surprisingly intuitive form. From the display, one can get a good feel for the audio levels for each channel and the amount of stereo and its compatibility as a mono signal.

| Degree of correlation | Explanation |
|---|---|
| +1 | Identical signals in both channels. This also creates a mono sound image on stereo devices, as no different signals are reproduced. |
| between +1 and 0 | A (more or less) mono-compatible stereo signal is present. |
| 0 | Signals are very different or one channel is missing. |
| between 0 and -1 | A stereo signal is present that is not mono-compatible. This means that the stereo signal cannot be used as a mono signal and is probably too quiet. |
| -1 | There are identical signals on both channels, but the polarity of the signal is reversed on one channel, e.g. as a result of reversed connection cables in one of the two signal paths. No mono-compatible stereo signal. |

== See also ==
- VU meter
- Peak programme meter
- Mixing console
- Goniometer
