= Digital audio workstation =

Device or software used for recording, editing and producing audio files

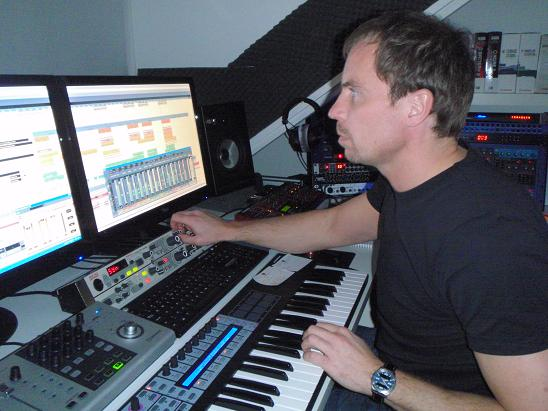
Music production using a digital audio workstation (DAW) with multi-monitor set-up

A digital audio workstation (DAW /dɔː/) is an electronic device or application software used for recording, editing and producing audio files. DAWs come in a wide variety of configurations, from a single software program on a laptop, to an integrated stand-alone unit, all the way to a highly complex configuration of numerous components controlled by a central computer. Regardless of configuration, modern DAWs have a central interface that allows the user to alter and mix multiple recordings and tracks into a final produced piece.

DAWs are used for producing and recording music, songs, speech, radio, television, soundtracks, podcasts, sound effects and nearly every other kind of complex recorded audio.

== History ==
Early attempts at digital audio workstations in the 1970s and 1980s faced limitations such as the high price of storage and the vastly slower processing and disk speeds of the time.

In 1978, Soundstream, who had made one of the first commercially available digital audio tape recorders in 1977, built what could be considered the first digital audio workstation using some of the most current computer hardware of the time. The Digital Editing System, as Soundstream called it, consisted of a DEC PDP-11/60 minicomputer running a custom software package called DAP (Digital Audio Processor), a Braegen 14"-platter hard disk drive, a storage oscilloscope to display audio waveforms for editing, and a video display terminal for controlling the system. Interface cards that plugged into the PDP-11's Unibus slots (the Digital Audio Interface, or DAI) provided analog and digital audio input and output for interfacing to Soundstream's digital recorders and conventional analog tape recorders. The DAP software could perform edits to the audio recorded on the system's hard disks and produce simple effects such as crossfades.

By the late 1980s, a number of personal computers such as the Macintosh, Atari ST, and Amiga began to have enough power to handle digital audio editing. Engineers used Macromedia's Soundedit, with Microdeal's Replay Professional and Digidesign's Sound Tools and Sound Designer to edit audio samples for sampling keyboards like the E-mu Emulator II and the Akai S900. Soon, people began to use them for simple two-track audio editing and audio mastering.

In 1989, Sonic Solutions released the first professional (48 kHz at 24 bit) disk-based non-linear audio editing system. The Macintosh IIfx-based Sonic System, based on research done earlier at George Lucas' Sprocket Systems, featured complete CD premastering, with integrated control of Sony's industry-standard U-matic tape-based digital audio editor.

Many major recording studios switched over to using digital audio after Digidesign introduced its Pro Tools software in 1991, modeled after the traditional method and signal flow in most analog recording devices. At this time, most DAWs were Apple Mac based (e.g., Pro Tools, Studer Dyaxis, Sonic Solutions). Around 1992, the first Windows-based DAWs started to emerge from companies such as Innovative Quality Software (IQS) (now SAWStudio), Soundscape Digital Technology, SADiE, Echo Digital Audio, and Spectral Synthesis. All the systems at this point used dedicated hardware for their audio processing.

In 1992, Sunrize Industries released the AD516 soundcard for big-box Amiga computers. This allowed up to 8 tracks of 16-bit 48 kHz direct-to-disk recording and playback using its Studio 16 software. It could also integrate directly into Blue Ribbon Soundworks' Bars & Pipes Pro MIDI software or NewTek's Video Toaster, thus providing a complete package of MIDI sequencing and/or video synchronization with non-linear hard disk recording.

In 1993, the German company Steinberg released Cubase Audio on Atari Falcon 030. This version brought DSP built-in effects with 8-track audio recording and playback using only native hardware. The first Windows-based software-only product, introduced in 1993, was Samplitude (which already existed in 1992 as an audio editor for the Commodore Amiga).

== Hardware ==
=== Integration ===
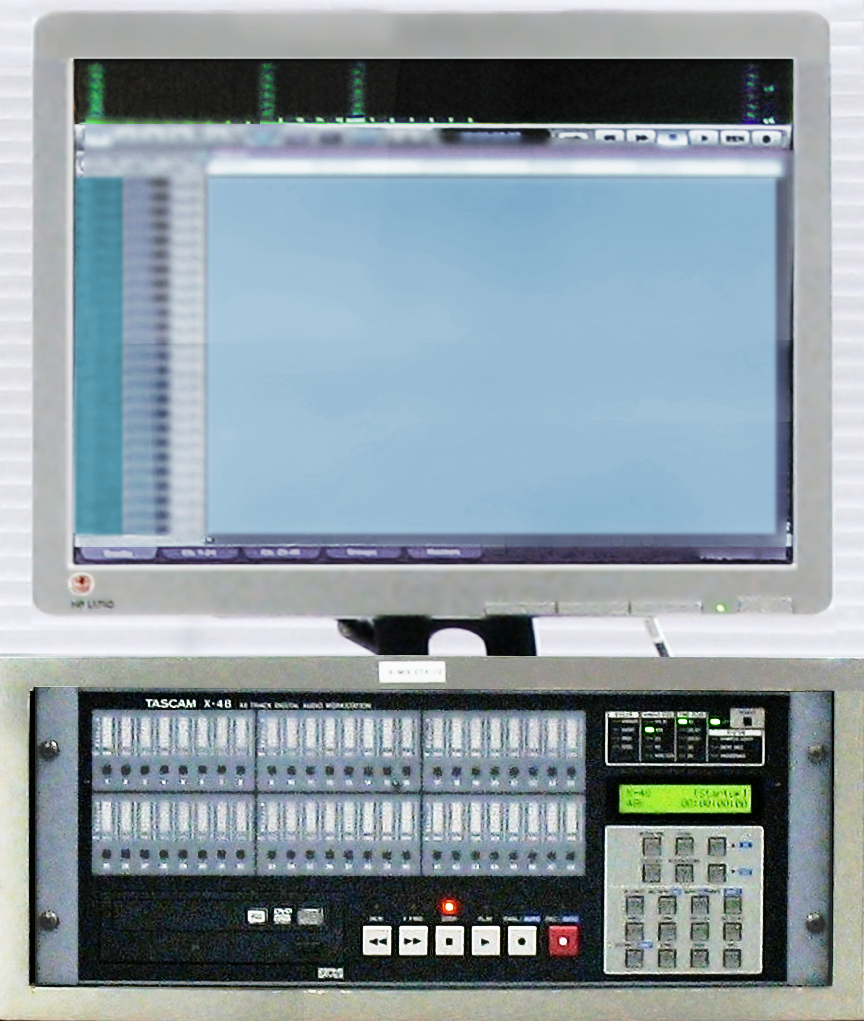
An integrated DAW consists of: a control screen, 48-track digital mixer integrated on hard disk recorder including data storage and audio interface. (TASCAM X-48)

An integrated DAW consists of a digital signal processing, control surface, audio converters, and data storage in one device. Integrated DAWs were popular before commonly available personal computers became powerful enough to run DAW software. As personal computer power and speed increased and prices decreased, the popularity of costly integrated systems dropped.

== Software ==
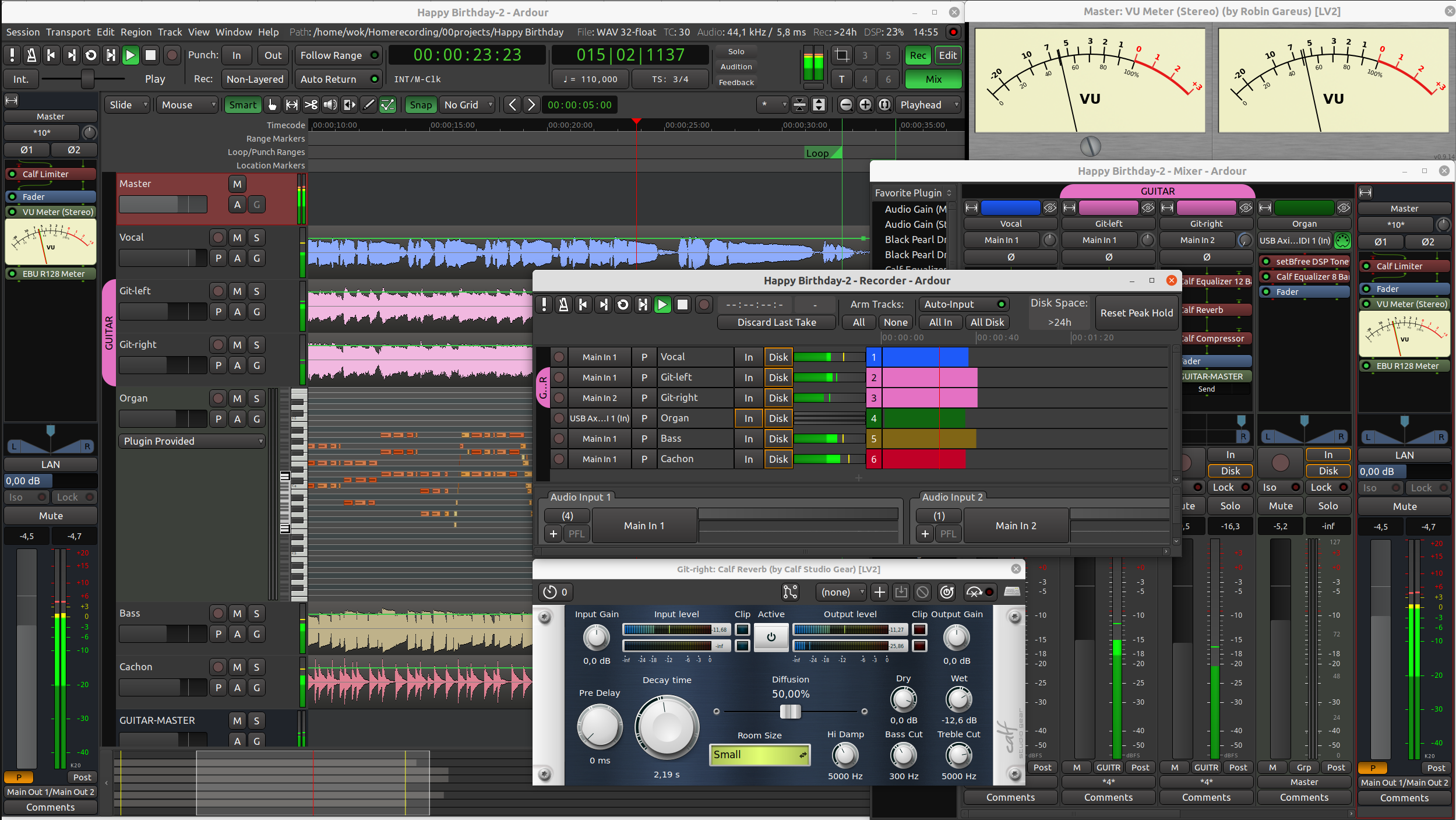
A screenshot of a typical software DAW (Ardour)

DAW can refer to the software itself, but traditionally, a computer-based DAW has four basic components: a computer, a sound card or other audio interface, audio editing software, and at least one user input device for adding or modifying data. This could be as simple as a mouse and keyboard or as sophisticated as a piano-style MIDI controller keyboard or automated audio control surface for mixing track volumes.

The computer acts as a host for the sound card, while the software provides the interface and functionality for audio editing. The sound card typically converts analog audio signals into a digital form, and digital back to analog audio when playing it back; it may also assist in further processing of the audio. The software controls all related hardware components and provides a user interface to allow for recording, editing, and playback.

Computer-based DAWs have extensive recording, editing, and playback capabilities (and some also have video-related features). For example, they can provide a practically limitless number of tracks to record on, polyphony, and virtual synthesizers or sample-based instruments to use for recording music. DAWs can also provide a wide variety of effects, such as reverb, to enhance or change the sounds themselves.

Simple smartphone-based DAWs, called mobile audio workstations (MAWs), are used (for example) by journalists for recording and editing on location.

As software systems, DAWs are designed with many user interfaces, but generally, they are based on a multitrack tape recorder metaphor, making it easier for recording engineers and musicians already familiar with using tape recorders to become familiar with the new systems. Therefore, computer-based DAWs tend to have a standard layout that includes transport controls (play, rewind, record, etc.), track controls and a mixer. A waveform display is another common feature.

Single-track DAWs display only one (mono or stereo form) track at a time. (Note: The term track is still used with DAWs, even though there is no physical track as there was in the era of tape-based recording.) Multitrack DAWs support operations on multiple tracks at once. Like a mixing console, each track typically has controls that allow the user to adjust the gain, equalization and stereo panning of the sound on each track. In a traditional recording studio, additional rackmount processing gear is physically plugged into the audio signal path to add reverb, compression, etc. However, a DAW can also route in software or use audio plug-ins (for example, a VST plugin) to process the sound on a track.

Perhaps the most significant feature available from a DAW that is not available in analog recording is the ability to undo a previous action, using a command similar to that of the undo function in word processing software. Undo makes it much easier to avoid accidentally permanently erasing or recording over a previous recording. If a mistake or unwanted change is made, the undo command is used to conveniently revert the changed data to a previous state. Cut, Copy, Paste, and Undo are familiar and common computer commands and they are usually available in DAWs in some form. More common functions include the modifications of several factors concerning a sound. These include wave shape, pitch, tempo, and filtering.

Commonly, DAWs feature some form of mix automation using procedural line segment-based or curve-based interactive graphs. The lines and curves of the automation graph are joined by or comprise adjustable points. By creating and adjusting multiple points along a waveform or control events, the user can specify parameters of the output over time (e.g., volume or pan). Automation data may also be directly derived from human gestures recorded by a control surface or MIDI controller.

MIDI recording, editing, and playback is increasingly incorporated into modern DAWs of all types, as is synchronization with other audio or video tools.

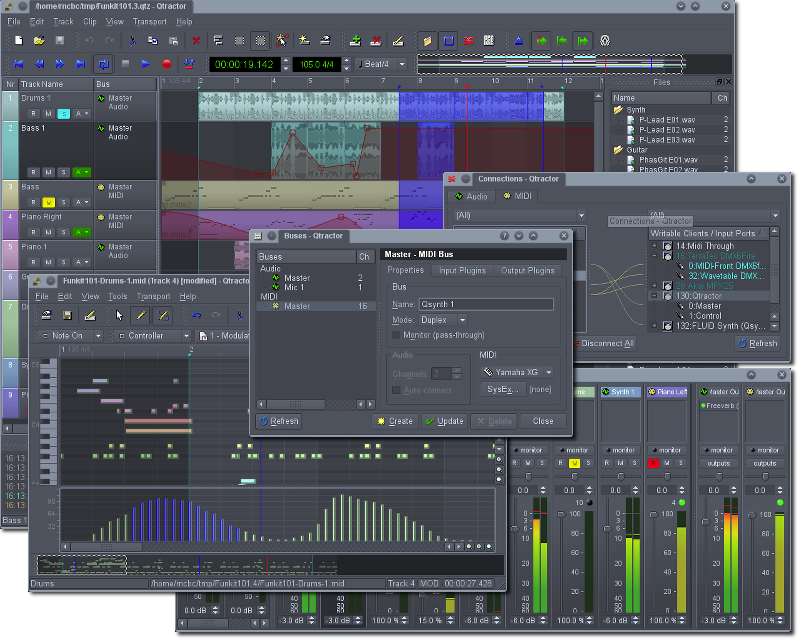
Qtractor screenshot

There are many free and open-source software programs that perform DAW functions. These are designed to run on a variety of operating systems and are usually developed non-commercially. Some of these include Ardour and LMMS.

Personal Composer, created by Jim Miller for Yamaha, was the star of the NAMM Show in 1983. Personal Composer runs under MS DOS 2.0 and includes a MIDI sequencer, synth editor (such as Yamaha's DX7), universal librarians and a score editor. The software was later released as Personal Composer System/2 (1988).

In 1996, Steinberg introduced a revamped Cubase (which was originally launched in 1989 as a MIDI sequencer for the Atari ST computer, later developed for Mac and Windows PC platforms, but had no audio capabilities until 1993's Cubase Audio) which could record and play back up to 32 tracks of digital audio on an Apple Macintosh without the need of any external DSP hardware. Cubase not only modeled a tape-like interface for recording and editing, but, in addition, using VST, also developed by Steinberg, modeled the entire mixing desk and effects rack common in analog studios. This revolutionized the DAW world, both in features and price tag, and was quickly imitated by most other contemporary DAW systems.

Digital audio applications for Linux and BSD fostered technologies such as Advanced Linux Sound Architecture (ALSA), which drives audio hardware, and JACK Audio Connection Kit. JACK allows any JACK-aware audio software to connect to any other audio software running on the system, such as connecting an ALSA- or OSS-driven soundcard to a mixing and editing front-end, like Ardour or Rosegarden. In this way, JACK acts as a virtual audio patch bay, and it can be configured to use a computer's resources in real time, with dedicated memory, and with various options that minimize the DAW's latency. This kind of abstraction and configuration allows DJs to use multiple programs for editing and synthesizing audio streams, or multitasking and duplexing, without the need for analog conversion, or asynchronous saving and reloading files, and ensures a high level of audio fidelity.

Members of the Linux Audio Development (LAD) mailing list have contributed to the development of standards such as the LADSPA, DSSI and LV2 plugin architectures. The Virtual Studio Technology (VST) plugin standard is supported by some programs.

=== Plug-ins ===
There are countless software plugins for DAW software, each one coming with its own unique functionality, thus expanding the overall variety of sounds and manipulations that are possible. Each has its own form of generating or manipulating sound, tone, pitch, and speed of a simple sound and transforming it into something different. To achieve an even more distinctive sound, multiple plugins can be used in layers and further automated to manipulate the original sounds.

=== Generative Audio Workstations ===
Recent developments in generative AI are changing DAW software. A research paper from Georgia Tech, titled "Composing with Generative Systems in the Digital Audio Workstation", proposed the term Generative Audio Workstation to describe this new class of DAWs.

Three examples of notable GAWs are AIVA, WavTool, and Symphony V. AIVA provides parameter-based AI MIDI song generation within a DAW. WavTool offers a browser DAW equipped with a GPT-4 composition assistant and AI text-to-sample generator. Symphony V provides generative vocal synthesis, note editing, and mixing tools.

Generative AI services have also become available through plugins that integrate with conventional DAWs, such as Izotope Neutron 4, TAIP, and Synthesizer V. Neutron 4 includes a mix assistant that uses machine learning to analyze audio and automatically apply processing effects. TAIP provides tape saturation powered by AI neural networks that imitate traditional DSP processing. Synthesizer V offers several AI vocalists whose notes can be manipulated.

To reduce the strain on computer memory, some plugin companies have developed thin client VSTs that use resources from a cloud server. For example, the audio-to-MIDI plugin Samplab offers a desktop application with user authentication and API calls that perform stem separation and MIDI transcription off of the computer's local device. This can improve load speeds or prevent applications from crashing.

== Impact ==
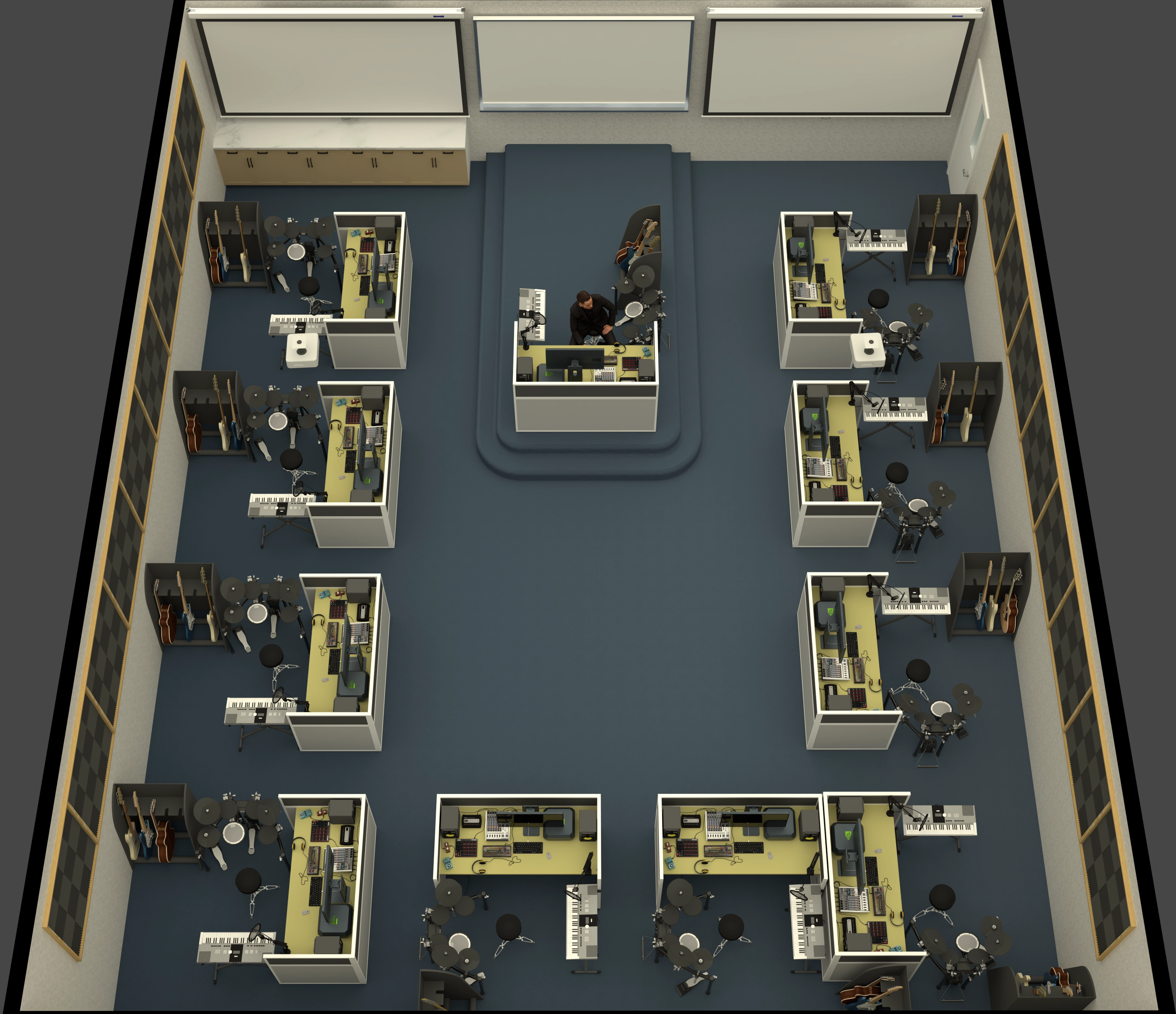
3D model of a digital audio workstation classroom

DAWs can be implemented in a music education class to show students how to use them and learn how to produce their own music. According to a study done by the Indonesia University of Education, the use of a DAW in music learning can let students build their learning of music production on their own. Another study done by the University of Milan made a DAW accessible to kids.

The usage of DAW can be found in most hip hop and EDM music with the use of looping an instrumental. With music production also moving to a laptop, music making has shifted from professional studios and into bedrooms.

== Notable examples ==
- Ableton Live
- ACID Pro
- Ardour
- Adobe Audition
- AudioFrame
- Audiotool
- Audacity
- BandLab
- Bitwig Studio
- Cakewalk by BandLab
- Cubase
- Digital Performer
- FL Studio
- Fostex Foundation 2000
- GarageBand
- LMMS
- Logic Pro
- MetaSynth
- Mixbus
- Mixcraft
- MuLab
- MusE
- Music Maker
- n-Track Studio
- Nuendo
- Pro Tools
- Qtractor
- REAPER
- Reason
- Renoise
- Rosegarden
- Samplitude
- SAWStudio
- Sound Forge
- Soundtrap
- Studio One
- Synclavier
- Tracktion Waveform

== See also ==
- Audio restoration – Removal of imperfections from recorded sound
- Broadcast automation – Systems that can run a broadcast facility in the absence of a human operator
- Comparison of digital audio editors
- Comparison of MIDI editors and sequencers
- List of free software for audio
- List of music software
- Music tracker – Type of software for creating music
- Music workstation – Device for composing electronic music
- Radio software
