= List of Linux audio software =

The following is an incomplete list of Linux audio software.

== Audio players ==
=== GStreamer-based ===
- Amarok is a free music player for Linux and other Unix-like operating systems. Multiple backends are supported (xine, helix and NMM).
- Clementine is a cross-platform, open-source, Qt based audio player, written in C++. It can play Internet radio streams; managing some media devices, playlists; supports visualizations, Audioscrobbler API. It was made as a spin-off of Amarok 1.4 and is a rougher version of said program.
- Exaile is a free software audio player for Unix-like operating systems that aims to be functionally similar to KDE’s Amarok. Unlike Amarok, Exaile is a Python program and uses the GTK toolkit.
- Guayadeque Music Player is a free and open-source audio player written in C++ using the wxWidgets toolkit.
- Muine is an audio player for the GNOME desktop environment. Muine is written in C# using Mono and Gtk#. The default backend is GStreamer framework but Muine can also use xine libraries.
- Quod Libet is a GTK based audio player, written in Python, using GStreamer or Xine as back ends. Its distinguishing features are a rigorous approach to tagging (making it especially popular with classical music fans) and a flexible approach to music library management. It supports regular expression and Boolean algebra-based searches, and is stated to perform efficiently with music libraries of tens of thousands of tracks.
- Rhythmbox is an audio player inspired by Apple iTunes.
- Songbird is a cross-platform, open-source media player and web browser. It is built using code from the Firefox web browser. The graphical user interface (GUI) is very similar to Apple iTunes, and it can sync with Apple iPods. Like Firefox, Songbird is extensible via downloadable add-ons. It's able to display lyrics retrieved from the net, and also the ones embedded through metadata (ID3v2 tag) after adding the LyricMaster plug-in. Linux official support for Songbird was discontinued in April, 2010. But in December, 2011 a group of programmers forked it openly as Nightingale.

=== Music Player Daemon based ===
- Cantata is a Qt-based front-end for Music Player Daemon.
- Ario is a light GTK2 client to MPD.

=== Other ===
- Audacious is a free media player for Linux or Linux-based systems. It can be expanded via plug-ins, including support for all popular codecs. On most systems a useful set of plug-ins is installed by default, supporting MP3, Ogg Vorbis and FLAC files. Audacious' classic interface looks and feels very similar to Winamp. It is compatible with LADSPA plug-ins.
- DeaDBeeF (as in 0xDEADBEEF) is a modular audio player for Linux, *BSD, OpenSolaris, macOS, and other UNIX-like systems.
- JuK is a free software audio player for KDE, the default player since KDE 3.2. JuK supports collections of MP3, Ogg Vorbis, and FLAC audio files.
- mpg123 is a real time MPEG 1.0/2.0/2.5 audio player/decoder for layers 1, 2 and 3 (MPEG 1.0 layer 3 a.k.a. MP3 most commonly tested). Among others working with Linux, Mac OS X, FreeBSD, SunOS4.1.3, Solaris 2.5, HPUX 9.x, SGI Irix and Cygwin or plain Windows. It is free software licensed under LGPL 2.1.
- Music on Console (MOC) is an ncurses-based console audio player. It is designed to be powerful and easy to use, and its command structure and window layouts are similar to the Midnight Commander console file manager. It is very configurable, with Advanced Linux Sound Architecture (ALSA), Open Sound System (OSS) or JACK Audio Connection Kit (JACK) outputs, customizable color schemes, interface layouts, key bindings, and tag parsing.
- Sound eXchange (SoX) is a cross-platform command-line audio editor.
- X MultiMedia System (XMMS) is a GTK1-based multimedia player which works on many platforms, but has some features which only work under Linux. XMMS can play media files such as .ogg, MP3, MOD's, WAV and others with the use of input plug-ins. It is a free software audio player similar to Winamp that runs on many Unix-like operating systems. However, development of XMMS has been deprecated in favor of XMMS2, a new audio player built from scratch on the more modern GTK2 libraries. See also Audacious on this page as a successor to the historic XMMS.
- Tomahawk is a cross-platform music player built with social media and multi-source music streaming in mind. It features support for services like Spotify, Grooveshark, Dilandau, SoundCloud, 4shared, Jamendo, Last.fm, Ampache, Owncloud, Ex.fm and Subsonic.

== Distributions and add-ons ==
- dyne:bolic, a Debian-based live cd/dvd distribution for multimedia production.
- Musix GNU+Linux, a discontinued live cd/dvd distribution based on Debian.
- Planet CCRMA, an add-on for Red Hat Linux with many tools and system mods.
- puredyne, a discontinued Ubuntu-based distribution.
- Ubuntu Studio, an Ubuntu-based distribution geared toward multimedia.
- AVLinux, a Debian-based distribution intended for multimedia content creation.

== Graphical programming ==
- Pure Data (Pd), graphical programming language.

== Audio programming languages (text-based) ==
- ChucK, an audio programming language for realtime synthesis, composition, and performance.
- Csound, composition, synthesis and processing.
- Nyquist, Lisp-based language for sound generation and analysis. Audacity supports plug-ins written in Nyquist.
- Sonic Pi, live coding and performance.
- SuperCollider, a language like Smalltalk for real-time audio synthesis.

== DJ tools ==
- Mixxx is a cross-platform and DJ package supporting a wide range of file formats, MIDI/HID controllers and timecode vinyl.
- xwax.

== Drum machines ==
- Hydrogen, drum machine and sequencer.

== Recording, editing and mastering ==
=== Digital audio workstations (DAWs) ===
- Ardour, a multi-track audio recorder. GPLv2+.
- LMMS, music composer. GPL.
- Qtractor, a full featured multitrack digital audio workstation (DAW), with audio and MIDI sequencer. GPL.
- Studio One(beta), proprietary.
- REAPER, a proprietary multitrack audio, MIDI recording and mastering software.
- Rosegarden, MIDI sequencer. GPL.
- Tracktion, proprietary and commercial digital audio workstation.
- Traverso DAW, a multi-track audio recorder. GPL.
- Harrison Mixbus and Mixbus32C, proprietary.
- Bitwig Studio, proprietary and commercial digital audio workstation.
- Renoise, a digital audio workstation (DAW) based upon the heritage and development of tracker software.

=== Audio editors and recorders ===
- Audacity, audio editor and recorder.
- Audio Recorder, simple audio recorder, still offers events to trigger or stop recording.
- Ecasound, audio recorder.
- Jokosher, audio editor.
- Ocenaudio free audio editor and recorder.
- Sound eXchange (SoX).
- Sweep, audio editor.
- WaveSurfer.

=== Sequencers ===
- MilkyTracker, an old-school tracker.
- MusE, MIDI-audio sequencer.
- Renoise, commercial modern tracker-style sequencer.
- Rosegarden, a music composition and editing environment based on a MIDI sequencer.
- Seq24, a loop based midi sequencer.

=== Other ===
- Baudline, signal analyzer.
- Buzztrax, music composer.
- EarQuiz Frequencies, software for technical ear training on equalization and frequency bands.
- Impro-Visor, edit and playback jazz solos over chord changes and rhythm.
- Mp3gain, adjust MP3 playback volume without re-encoding.

== Sound servers ==
- aRts, the KDE 3 soundserver.
- Phonon, the multimedia framework provided by Qt 4 and used in KDE 4.
- Enlightened Sound Daemon (EsounD, ESD).
- JACK Audio Connection Kit (JACK), real-time sound server.
- Network Audio System (NAS).
- Network-Integrated Multimedia Middleware (NMM).
- PulseAudio, a sound server, drop-in replacement for EsounD.
- PipeWire, a server for multimedia routing and pipeline processing.

== Samplers ==
- LinuxSampler, sampler.
- sfizz, sfz sampler, BSD-2-Clause.

== Synthesizers ==
- Aeolus, pipe organ synthesizer, written in C++.
- Amsynth.
- Dexed, synth that models the Yamaha DX7 synthesizer.
- DIN Is Noise (din), software synthesiser, musical instrument, uses computer mouse as bow.
- FluidSynth, with the interface QSynth.
- Gnaural, binaural beat and pink noise synthesizer.
- GrandOrgue, another pipe organ synthesizer, written in C++ and WxWidgets.
- LMMS, tracker, sequencer, synthesizer.
- Organteq, non-free pipe organ synthesizer.
- OT Keys, Lofi piano synthesizer using vintage "Commuted Piano Synthesis" technology.
- Pianoteq, digital physical modeling of pianos and related instruments.
- Surge XT, hybrid synthesizer.
- TiMidity, Play-convert MIDI files as-to PCM.
- WildMIDI, Some alternative to TiMidity.
- FluidSynth, a free open source software synthesizer which converts MIDI note data into an audio signal.
- Yoshimi, software synthesizer.
- ZynAddSubFX, software synthesizer.

== Effects processing ==
- EasyEffects, former known as PulseEffects, effects processing for input and output audio streams with PulseAudio.
- FreqTweak, real-time audio processing with spectral displays.
- Linux Audio Developers Simple Plug-in API (LADSPA).
- Disposable Soft Synth Interface (DSSI), a virtual instrument (software synthesizer) plug-in architecture.
- Sound eXchange (SoX), the audio Swiss Army knife.
- LV2, is the new audio Linux standard for plug-ins.

== Format transcoding ==
- fre:ac.
- OggConvert.
- Sound eXchange (SoX).
- GNOME SoundConverter.

== Radio broadcasting ==
- Airtime, an automation system for radio stations.
- Campcaster (discontinued), an automation system for radio stations.
- Icecast, free server software for streaming multimedia.
- OpenBroadcaster, LPFM IPTV broadcast automation tools.

== Radio listening ==
- Streamtuner, browse and listen to hundreds of streamed radio stations.

== Score and tablature edition software ==
- Frescobaldi, score writer.
- Denemo, score editor.
- LilyPond, score typesetter.
- NoteEdit, score writer.
- MuseScore, score writer.
- TuxGuitar, a tabulature editor, score writer and player oriented for guitarists.

== See also ==
- Comparison of free software for audio.
- List of music software.
