= LMMS =

Free software digital audio workstation

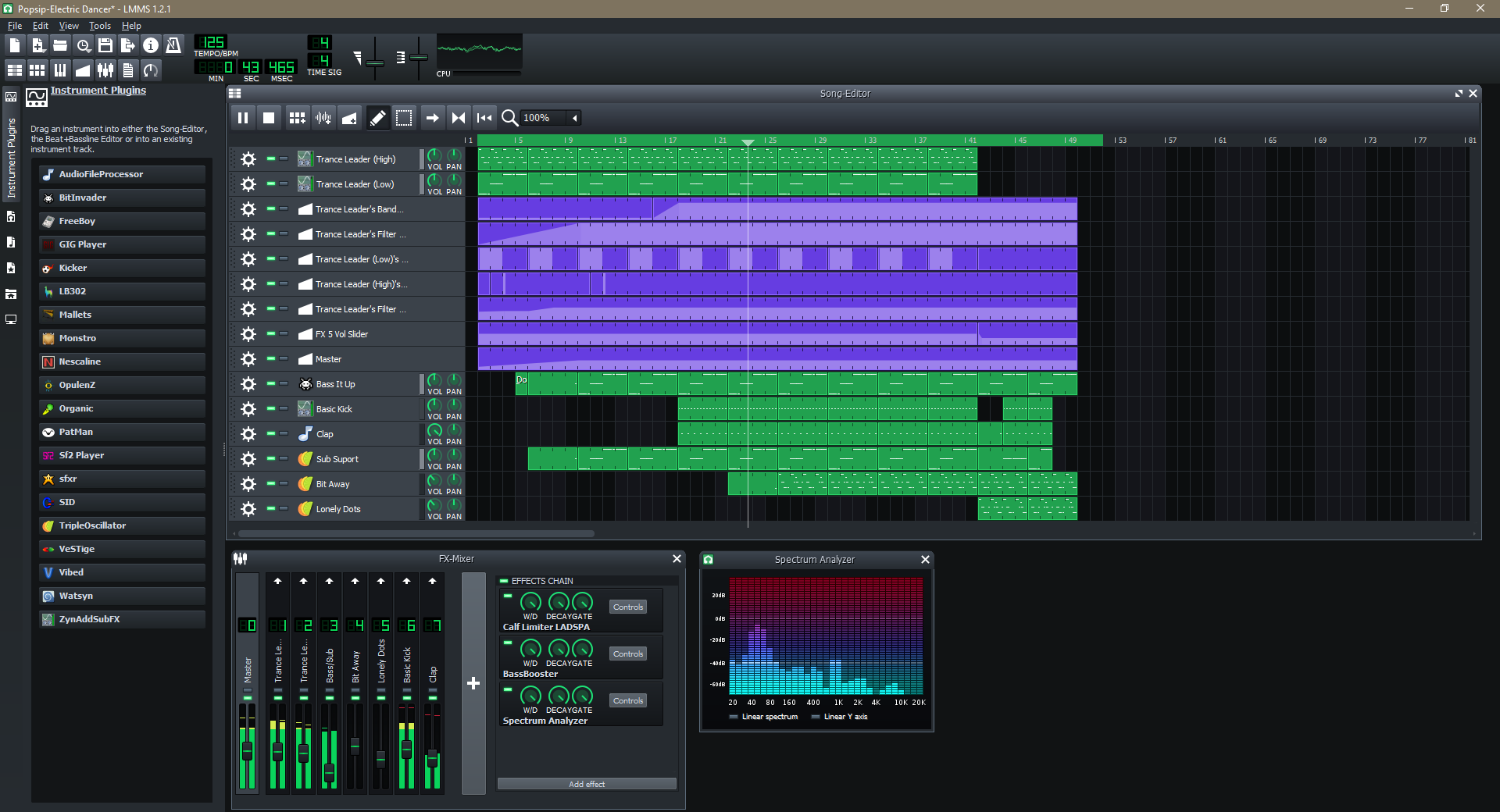
- Screenshot of a project in LMMS 1.2.1
- Original authors: Paul Giblock; Tobias Junghans
- Developer: LMMS developers
- Release: 2004; 22 years ago; as Linux MultiMedia Studio
- Stable release: 1.2.2 / 4 July 2020; 6 years ago
- Preview release: 1.3.0-alpha.2 / 6 September 2026; 5 days ago
- Written in: C++ with Qt
- Operating system: Cross-platform: Microsoft Windows, macOS, Linux, Haiku
- Platform: x86 and x86-64 (Linux, macOS, Windows), only Linux: arm64, armel, armhf, mips, mips64el, mipsel, ppc64el, s390x
- Available in: 20 languages
- Type: Digital audio workstation
- License: GPL-2.0-or-later
- Website: lmms.io
- Repository: github.com/LMMS/lmms

LMMS (formerly Linux MultiMedia Studio) is a digital audio workstation application program. It allows music to be produced by arranging samples, synthesizing sounds, entering notes via computer keyboard or mouse (or other pointing device) or by playing on a MIDI keyboard, and combining the features of trackers and sequencers. It is free and open source software, written in Qt and released under GPL-2.0-or-later.

== System requirements ==
LMMS is available for multiple operating systems, including Linux, OpenBSD, macOS, and Windows. It requires a 1.5 GHz CPU, 1 GB of RAM and a two-channel sound card.

== Program features ==
LMMS accepts soundfonts and GUS patches, and it supports the Linux Audio Developer's Simple Plugin API (LADSPA) and LV2 (only master branch, since 24.05.2020). It can use VST plug-ins on Win32, Win64, or Wine32. The nightly versions support LinuxVST. Currently MacOS doesn't support them.

It can import Musical Instrument Digital Interface (MIDI) and Hydrogen files and can read and write customized presets and themes.

Audio can be exported in the WAV, FLAC, Ogg and MP3 file formats.

Projects can be saved in the compressed MMPZ file format or the uncompressed MMP file format.

== Editors ==
- Song Editor – for arranging instruments, samples, groups of notes, automation, and more
- Beat+Bassline Editor – for quickly sequencing rhythms
- FX Mixer – for sending multiple audio inputs through groups of effects and sending them to other mixer channels, infinite channels are supported
- Piano Roll – for editing patterns and melodies
- Automation Editor – for moving almost any knob or widget over the course of the song
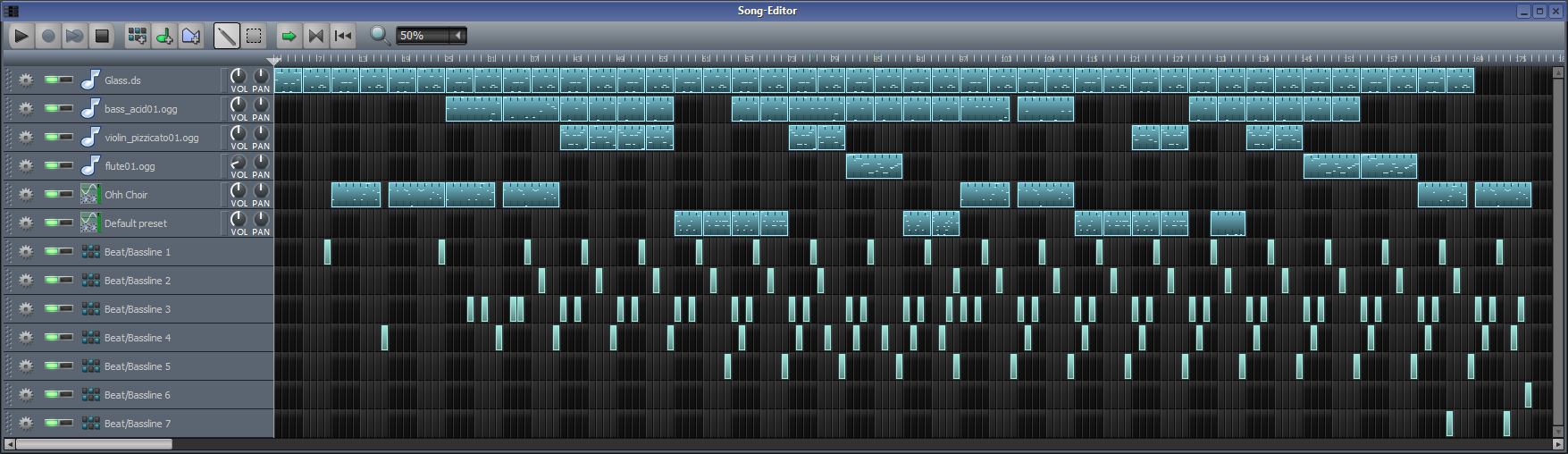
Song Editor

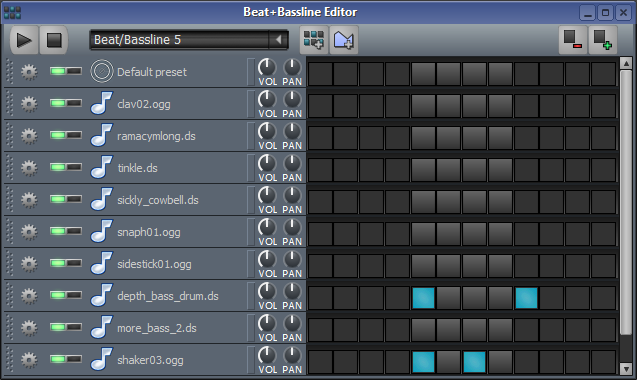
Beat+Bassline Editor

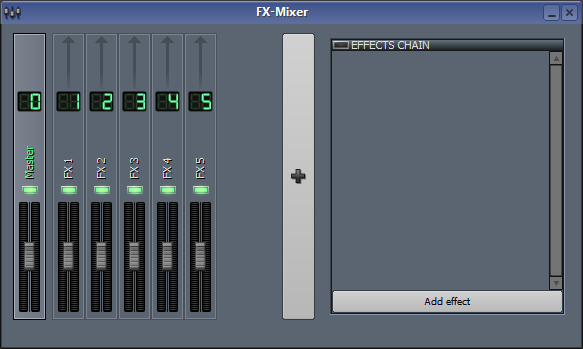
FX mixer

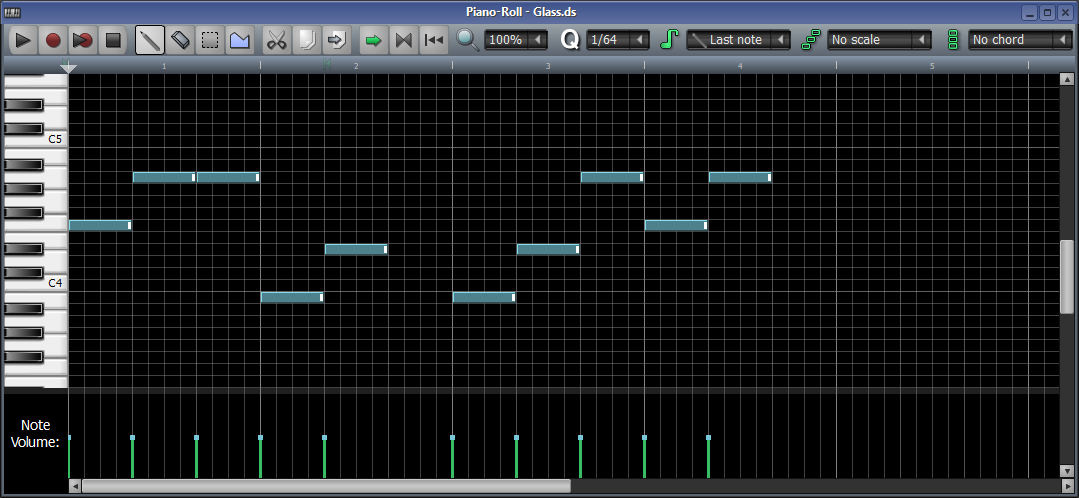
Piano Roll

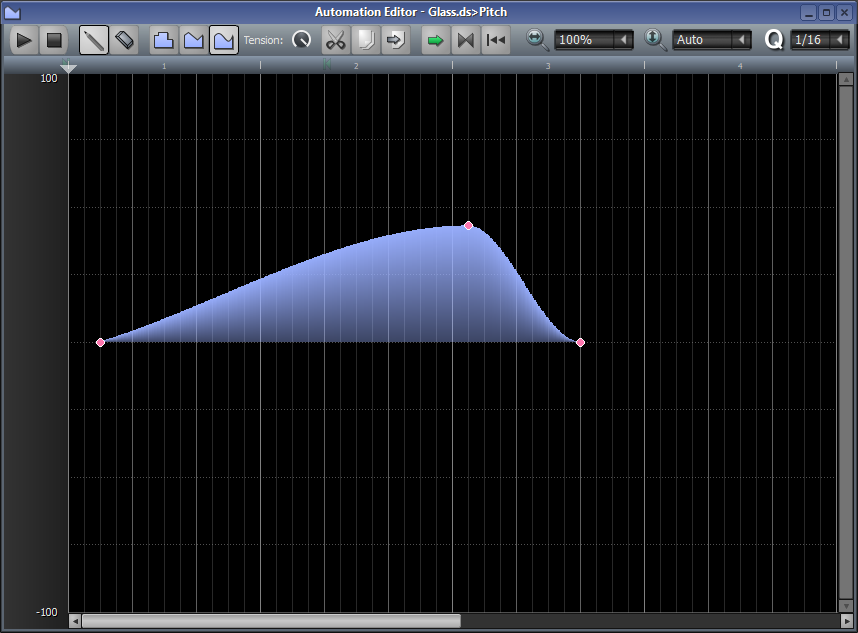
Automation Editor

== Audio plug-ins ==
LMMS includes a variety of audio plug-ins that can be drag-and-dropped onto instrument tracks in the Song Editor and Beat+Bassline Editor.

Synthesizer plugins:

- BitInvader – single-oscillator synthesis
- FreeBoy – emulator of Game Boy audio processing unit (APU)
- Kicker – drum synthesizer
- LB302 – imitation of the Roland TB-303
- Mallets – tuneful percussion synthesizer
- Monstro – 3-oscillator synthesizer with modulation matrix
- Nescaline – NES-like synthesizer
- OpulenZ – 2-operator FM synthesizer
- Organic – organ-like synthesizer
- sfxr – port of Tomas Petterson's sfxr generator
- SID – emulator of the Commodore 64 chips
- TripleOscillator – 3-oscillator synthesizer with 5 modulation modes
- Vibed – vibrating string modeler
- Watsyn – 4-oscillator synthesizer with 4 modulation modes
- Xpressive – mathematical expression parser synthesizer (only in alpha)
- ZynAddSubFX

Other plugins

- AudioFileProcessor (AFP) – basic sampler with trimming and looping capabilities
- Carla Patchbay and Carla Rack – implementation of Carla access through a plugin (only in alpha)
- GIG Player – libgig-based GigaSampler/GigaStudio instrument file player
- PatMan – GUS patch player
- SlicerT – slicer with tempo detection (only in nightly)
- Sf2 Player – a Fluidsynth-based SoundFont player
- VeSTige – interface for VST2 plugins

== Standards ==
- Musical Instrument Digital Interface (MIDI)
- SoundFont (SF2)
- Virtual Studio Technology (VST)
- Linux Audio Developer's Simple Plugin API (LADSPA)
- LV2 (only master branch, since 24.05.2020)
- Gravis Ultrasound (GUS) patches
- GigaStudio/GigaSampler instrument files
- JACK Audio Connection Kit (JACK)
- ZynAddSubFX

== Audio output examples ==
Skiessi – C64
A short chiptune-style music sample created with LMMS, demonstrating the abilities of the program's MOS Technology SID emulator

WzWoop
A short example created with LMMS

Hoofa
A progressive electronic song created with LMMS

== See also ==
- List of music software
- List of Linux audio software
- Comparison of free software for audio
- Multitrack recording
- Comparison of multitrack recording software
