= Comparison of free software for audio =

This comparison of free software for audio lists notable free and open source software for use by sound engineers, audio producers, and those involved in sound recording and reproduction.

== Audio analysis ==
Name	Creator	Linux?	macOS?	Unix?	Windows?	Note	License
Praat	Paul Boersma and David Weenink of the University of Amsterdam	Yes	Yes		Yes	A program for the analysis of speech in phonetics.	GPL-2.0-or-later
Sonic Visualiser	Centre for Digital Music at Queen Mary, University of London	Yes	Yes		Yes		GPL-2.0-or-later
Partiels	Pierre Guillot at IRCAM, Paris	Yes	Yes		Yes	A software suite for analysing and exploring the content and characteristics of sounds.	GPL-3.0-or-later
WaveSurfer		Yes	Yes		Yes		BSD-like

== Converters ==
Name	Creator	Linux?	macOS?	Unix?	Windows?	Note	License
FFmpeg	Fabrice Bellard	Yes	Yes	Yes	Yes	Audio & video.	LGPL-2.1-or-later, GPL-2.0-or-later
fre:ac	Robert Kausch	Yes	Yes	Yes	Yes	Formerly BonkEnc.	GPL-2.0-or-later
Libav	Libav team	Yes	Yes	Yes	Yes	Audio & video.	LGPL-2.1-or-later, GPL-2.0-or-later
MPlayer		Yes	Yes	Yes	Yes	Audio & video.	GPL-2.0-or-later

== DJ software ==
Name	Creator	Linux?	macOS?	Unix?	Windows?	Note	License
Mixxx	Mixxx Development Team	Yes	Yes	Yes	Yes		GPL-2.0-or-later
Xwax	Mark Hills	Yes	No	No	No		GPL-2.0-only

== Distributions and other platforms ==
Various projects have formed to integrate the existing free software audio packages.

Name	Creator	Description	Note	License
AVLinux		Linux distribution		various
dyne:bolic		Linux distribution		various
Musix GNU+Linux		Linux distribution		various
Planet CCRMA		set of packages (in RPM format)		
Ubuntu Studio		Linux distribution		various

== Modular systems ==
Name	Creator	Linux?	macOS?	Unix?	Windows?	Note	License
Integra Live	Birmingham Conservatoire	No	Yes	No	Yes		GPL-2.0-or-later

== Notation ==
Name	Creator	Linux?	macOS?	Unix?	Windows?	Note	License
LilyPond	Han-Wen Nienhuys and Jan Nieuwenhuizen	Yes	Yes	Yes	Yes	A music engraving program.	GPL-3.0-or-later
MuseScore	Werner Schweer	Yes	Yes	Yes Various BSDs	Yes	A WYSIWYG scorewriter with midi playback and audio export.	v4: GPL-3.0-only v0-3: GPL-2.0-only with font exception, Proprietary (mobile app and online service)
Impro-Visor	Bob Keller	Yes	Yes	Yes	Yes	Lead sheet notation, jazz improvisation, auto-accompaniment.	GPL-2.0-or-later
MusiXTeX	Andreas Egler	Yes	Yes	Yes	Yes	Music typesetting, TeX-based notation, high-quality scores.	GPL-2.0-or-later

== Players ==
Name	GUI	Programming language	Database	Linux?	macOS?	Unix?	Windows?	Notes	License
Amarok	Qt	C++	MySQL	Yes	Yes		Unstable		GPL-2.0-or-later
Audacious	GTK / Qt	C		Yes			Yes		BSD 2-Clause
Banshee	GTK+	C#	SQLite	Yes	Yes		Yes	Inactive since 2014	MIT
Clementine	Qt	C++	SQLite3	Yes	Yes		Yes		GPL-3.0-or-later
DeaDBeeF	GTK+	C, C++, Objective-C, Assembly		Yes	Yes		Yes		GPLv2, zlib
Exaile	GTK	Python	Pickle	Yes	Yes		Yes		GPL-2.0-or-later
Guayadeque	wxWidgets	C++, C	SQLite3	Yes					GPL-3.0-or-later
JuK	Qt	C++		Yes		Yes	Yes	Linux (KDE)	GPL-2.0-or-later
Miro	WebKit in GTK/Cocoa	Python		Yes	Yes		Yes	Discontinued in 2013	GPL-2.0-or-later
Muine	GTK#	C#		Yes				Can use GStreamer and xine	GPL-2.0-or-later
Nightingale	XULRunner	C++	SQLite?	Yes	Yes		Yes	Fork of Songbird; inactive since 2014	GPL v2, MPL, BSD
Quod Libet	GTK	Python	Pickle	Yes	Yes		Yes		GPL-2.0-or-later
qmmp	Qt	C++		Yes		Yes	Yes		GPL-2.0-or-later
Rhythmbox	GTK	C		Yes		Yes		Not GNU Data Access	GPL-2.0-or-later
Sayonara Player	Qt	C++		Yes		Yes			GPL-3.0-or-later
Songbird	XULRunner	C++	SQLite?	Unofficial	Yes	Unofficial	Yes	Abandoned, final release on February 4, 2013	GPL v2 with exceptions, Android client closed source
Tomahawk	Qt	C++	SQLite	Yes	Yes		Yes	Abandoned, final release on April 15, 2015	GPL-3.0-or-later
XMMS	GTK+	C++		Yes		Yes		Discontinued in 2007	GPL-2.0-or-later

== Programming languages ==
Many computer music programming languages are implemented in free software. See also the comparison of audio synthesis environments.

Name	Creator	Linux?	macOS?	Unix?	Windows?	Note	License
Csound	Csound community, Barry Vercoe	Yes	Yes	No?	Yes		LGPL-2.1-or-later
ChucK	Ge Wang, Perry Cook	Yes	Yes	No?	Yes		GPL-2.0-or-later (Mac, Linux, Windows versions) Proprietary (iOS version)
Nyquist	Computer Music Project at Carnegie Mellon University, Roger B. Dannenberg	Yes	Yes	Yes	Yes		
Pure Data	Pd Community, Miller Puckette	Yes	Yes	Yes	Yes		BSD-3-Clause
Sonic Pi	Sam Aaron	Yes	Yes	?	Yes		MIIT
SuperCollider	SuperCollider community, James McCartney	Yes	Yes	Yes?	Yes		GPL-3.0-or-later
TidalCycles	Alex McLean et al	Yes	Yes	Yes	Yes		GPL-3.0-or-later

== Radio broadcasting ==
See also streaming below.

Name	Creator	Linux?	macOS?	Unix?	Windows?	Note	License
Airtime (software)	Sourcefabric	Yes	No	?	No	Successor to Campcaster	From 2.5.2: AGPL-3.0-only; 1.6 to 2.5.1: GPL-3.0-only
Campcaster	Sourcefabric	Yes	No	?	No		GPL-2.0-or-later
OpenBroadcaster	OpenBroadcaster	Yes	No	Yes	No		AGPL-3.0-or-later

== Recording and editing ==
The following packages are digital audio editors.

Name	Creator	Linux?	macOS?	Unix?	Windows?	GUI toolkit	Note	License
Ardour	Paul Davis	Yes	Yes	Yes	Yes	GTK+	multi-track audio recorder and editor	GPL-2.0-or-later
Audacity	Dominic Mazzoni	Yes	Yes	Yes	Yes	wxWidgets	multi-track audio recorder and editor	GPL-2.0-or-later, CC BY 3.0 (documentation)
Ecasound		Yes	Yes	Yes	Yes limited support through Cygwin	command line	audio recorder	GPL-2.0-or-later
Gnome Wave Cleaner	Jeff Welty	Yes	No		No	GTK+	audio editor	GPL-2.0-or-later
Jokosher	Jokosher community	Yes	No		Yes	GTK+		GPL-2.0-only with exception
LMMS	Tobias Doerffel	Yes	Yes		Yes	Qt	multi-track audio editor intended as a replacement for Cubase-like software (DAW)	GPL-2.0-or-later
MusE		Yes	No		No	Qt	MIDI sequencer	GPL-2.0-or-later
Qtractor		Yes	No		No	Qt	A non-destructive multi-track audio and MIDI Workstation (DAW)	GPL-2.0-or-later
Rosegarden	Chris Cannam	Yes	No		No	Qt	MIDI sequencer and multi-track recorder	GPL-2.0-or-later
SoX		Yes	Yes	Yes	Yes	command-line	multi-track audio editor/processor	LGPL-2.1-or-later, GPL-2.0-or-later
Sweep	Conrad Parker	Yes	No	Yes	No			GPL-2.0-or-later
Traverso DAW	Remon Sijrier	Yes	Yes		Yes		multi-track audio recorder and editor	GPL
WaveSurfer	Centre for Speech Technology at KTH	Yes	Yes	Yes	Yes	Tk		BSD-like

== Softsynths ==
Name	Creator	Linux?	macOS?	Unix?	Windows?	Note	License
FluidSynth		Yes	Yes	Yes	Yes	SoundFont player/renderer	LGPL-2.1-or-later
TiMidity++		Yes	Yes	Yes	Yes		GPL-2.0-or-later
Yoshimi	Alan Calvert	Yes	No	Yes Various BSDs	No	Forked from ZynAddSubFX in 2009	GPL-2.0-or-later
ZynAddSubFX	Paul Nasca	Yes	Yes	Yes	Yes		GPL-2.0-or-later
WildMIDI		Yes	?	?	?	Some alternative to TiMidity	Player: GPL-3.0-or-later; Library: LGPL-3.0-or-later
VCV Rack	Andrew Belt	Yes	Yes		Yes		GPL-3.0-or-later

== Streaming ==
These programs are for use with streaming audio.

Name	Creator	Linux?	macOS?	Unix?	Windows?	Note	License
Firefly Media Server		Yes	Yes		Yes	streams music to DAAP clients like iTunes and Rhythmbox	GPL-2.0-or-later
Icecast		Yes		Yes	Yes	a broadcast server, serves audio signals to clients over the HTTP protocol	GPL-2.0-only
VLC media player		Yes	Yes	Yes	Yes	media and server programs for video and audio streaming	VLC: GPL-2.0-or-later libVLC: LGPL-2.1-or-later

== Technologies ==
Name	Creator	Linux?	macOS?	Unix?	Windows?	Note	License
Advanced Linux Sound Architecture (ALSA)		Yes				the sound card driver and management system in the Linux kernel	GPL-2.0-or-later; LGPL-2.1-or-later
aRts		Yes				an audio programming API and sound server for general desktop, no longer in development	GPL
DSSI		Yes				a plugin architecture for software synthesizers	LGPL-2.1-or-later
GStreamer		Yes	Yes	Yes	Yes	a graph-based multimedia framework	LGPL-2.1-or-later
JACK Audio Connection Kit (JACK)	JACK Team, Paul Davis	Yes	Yes (JACK OS X)		Yes (jackdmp)	a sound server for integration of general and low-latency pro audio applications, including timebase transport	GPL-2.0-or-later; LGPL-2.1-or-later
Linux Audio Developers Simple Plugin API (LADSPA)		Yes				a plugin architecture for digital signal processing	LGPL-2.1-or-later
Open Sound System		Yes		Yes		a sound card management and driver system for Unix operating systems	BSD-2-Clause; CDDL-1.0; GPL-2.0-only; Proprietary (formerly)
PipeWire	Wim Taymans	Yes		Yes (FreeBSD)		a media daemon, unifying JACK Audio Connection Kit, PulseAudio, and GStreamer	MIT License
PortAudio & PortMidi	Ross Bencina	Yes	Yes		Yes	a cross-platform, open-source C language library for real-time audio & midi I/O	MIT License
PulseAudio		Yes	Yes	Yes (Solaris, FreeBSD, NetBSD)	Yes	a sound server for general desktop and multihost LAN applications	LGPL-2.1-or-later
sndio		Yes	No	Yes (FreeBSD, NetBSD, OpenBSD)	No	sound and MIDI server	ISC

== Trackers ==
These music sequencer programs allow users to arrange notes (pitch-shifted sound samples) on a timeline: see tracker (music software).

Name	Creator	Linux?	macOS?	Unix?	Windows?	Note	License
MilkyTracker		Yes	Yes	Yes	Yes	Also runs on various other platforms including Windows Mobile, PlayStation and AmigaOS 4.	GPL-3.0-or-later; MilkyPlay: BSD-3-Clause
OpenMPT	Olivier Lapicque	No	No	No	Yes	Released as free software in 2004	BSD-3-Clause (since OpenMPT 1.17.02.53) / GPL-2.0-or-later, partly public domain
SoundTracker		Yes	No	Yes	No	Fast Tracker clone	GPL-2.0-or-later
SunVox	Alexander Zolotov	Yes	Yes	Yes	Yes	Also runs on Windows CE.	Proprietary (Music Creation Studio); BSD-3-Clause (Engine)

== Other ==
Name	Creator	Linux?	macOS?	Unix?	Windows?	Note	License
Gnaural		Yes	Yes	Yes	Yes	Binaural beat and pink noise generator	GPL-2.0-or-later
Hydrogen		Yes	Yes	Partial	Partial	an advanced drum machine	GPL-2.0-or-later
libsndfile		Yes	Yes	Yes	Yes	library for reading and writing many sound formats	LGPL-2.1-or-later
EasyEffects	Wellington Wallace	Yes	No	Yes	No	Effects processing for applications using PipeWire sound server	GPL-3.0-or-later

== See also ==
- ABC notation
- Comparison of 3D computer graphics software
- Comparison of computer-aided design software
- List of 3D animation software
- List of 3D modeling software
- List of 3D rendering software
- List of free and open-source software packages
- List of Linux audio software
- List of video editing software
