= GNOME SoundConverter =

SoundConverter

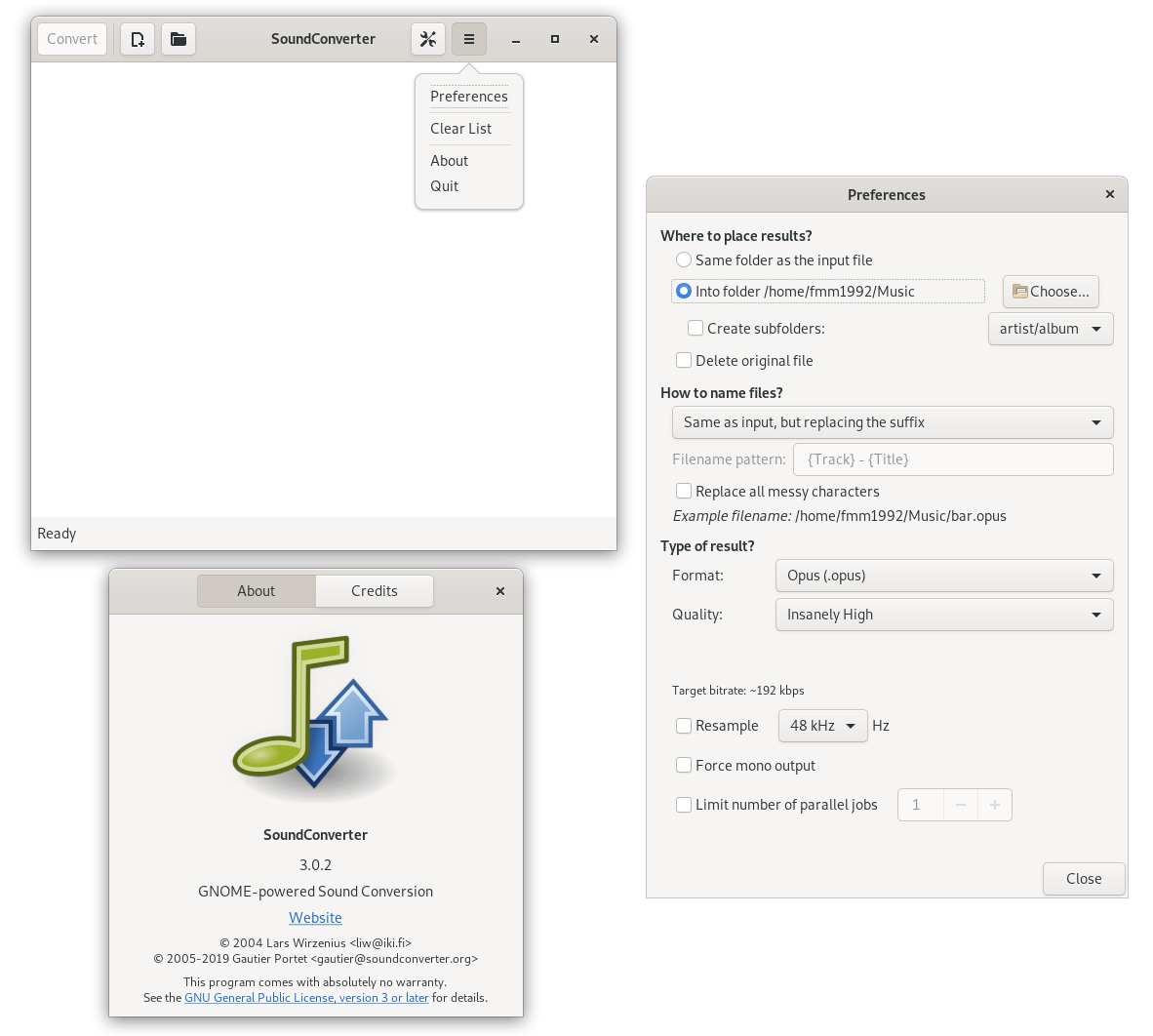
- SoundConverter 3.0.2 with its preferences
- Original author: Lars Wirzenius (2004)
- Developers: Gautier Portet (2005-2020) and free software community
- Stable release: 4.1.1 / 27 July 2025; 4 months ago
- Repository: github.com/kassoulet/soundconverter
- Written in: Python (PyGTK)
- Operating system: Linux
- Platform: GNOME
- Available in: English
- Type: Transcoding
- License: GNU GPLv3
- Website: soundconverter.org

GNOME SoundConverter is an unofficial GNOME-based free and open-source transcoder for digital audio files. It uses GStreamer for input and output files. It has multi threaded design and can also extract the audio from video files.

From many years ago, it is available in the repositories of many Linux distributions included Debian, Fedora, openSUSE, Ubuntu, Gentoo and Arch Linux.

== Features ==
- Change filenames based on custom pattern or predefined patterns
- Create folder according to tags or selected location
- Can delete original file
- Adjust bitrate
- Importing the all metadata including image from original file

== See also ==
- OggConvert
- List of Linux audio software
- Comparison of free software for audio
