= Buzztrax =

Free and open-source music tracker

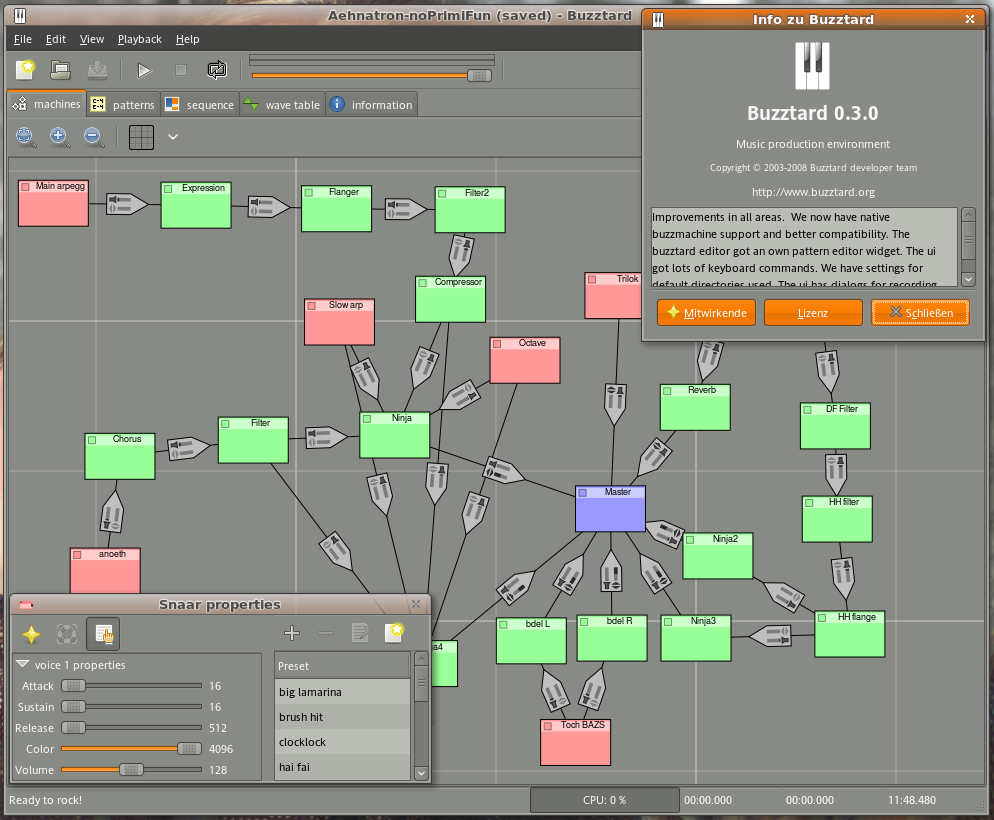
- Developers: Stefan Sauer and others
- Stable release: 0.10.2 / 6 January 2016
- Operating system: Linux
- Type: Music tracker
- License: GNU Lesser General Public License
- Website: https://www.buzztrax.org/
- Repository: github.com/Buzztrax/buzztrax

Buzztrax is a free software project designed to create a clone of the Buzz music composer. Its functionality is to preserve the playability of the compositions made with Buzz. Songs are made by adding virtual sound generators and effects, connecting them, recording short musical phrases and arranging them in the sequencer. For distribution, songs can be exported to common audio formats such as OGG, MP3, WAV and many others.

== History ==
In the middle of 2002, the main developer, Stefan Kost, lost a song during a Buzz session because of a software error. As the sources of Buzz were known to be lost, they started a new project called Buzztard, and they registered on SourceForge. The name was chosen "for two reasons: the Buzztard.org domain was available, and we liked the mix of Buzz and bastard (it's not a tracker, and it's not a classical sequencer)."

A first version was released in October 2006. A demo was presented at Linux Audio Conference (LAC) 2007. Several releases have followed since. Starting with version 0.5 Linux distributions (such as Debian, Ubuntu and Arch Linux) have picked up the project and provide ready to install packages. In 2013 the project was renamed to Buzztrax after Google rejected the project for its Summer of Code program due to the name.

== Features ==
The software is based on the GStreamer media framework. As it is the only music composer built on GStreamer it serves as a test-bed for related features. The graphical editor uses GTK+ for its GUI. It integrated with the GNOME desktop, but does not require it. The editor extensively supports copy and paste and unlimited undo and redo. A notable feature of version 0.6 is the editing journal that helps to prevent loss of data in the case of a crash.

The component architecture supports song import modules. Buzztrax can open songs both in its native and Buzz's format. A wrapper component allows using the existing Buzz-machine binaries under x86 Linux and open-source Buzz-machines on all platforms. A GStreamer bridge plugin makes them available to all GStreamer applications. Another GStreamer plugin enables the playback of buzztrax songs in each GStreamer based media-player. An interaction controller framework allows the use of MIDI devices and any input devices (such as joysticks or Wii Remotes) to be used to control parameters of sounds in real-time.

== Reception ==
In 2009, Buzztrax's user interface was praised by Linux Journal, calling it "a good example of the modern design for a music tracker" and that "the tracker composition interface resembles the standard UI for most trackers".

== See also ==
- List of free software for audio
- List of Linux audio software
