= Sound exchange =

Sound exchange may refer to:

- SoX, a free cross-platform digital audio editor
- SoundExchange, a collective rights management organization that collects royalties on the behalf of sound recording copyright owners
