= Hydrogen (disambiguation) =

Hydrogen is the chemical element with symbol H and atomic number 1.

Hydrogen may also refer to:

- Dihydrogen, an allotrope of hydrogen
- Hydrogen atom, about the physics of atomic hydrogen
- Hydrogen ion
- Hydron (chemistry), a.k.a. "proton" or "hydrogen"
- Isotopes of hydrogen
  - Hydrogen-2 (deuterium)
  - Hydrogen-3 (tritium)
  - Hydrogen-4
  - Hydrogen-5

== Other things named "hydrogen" ==
- Hydrogen (horse), a champion Australian Thoroughbred racehorse
- Hydrogen (software), drum machine software
- Gemini 4 Hydrogen, AI language model

== See also ==
- H (disambiguation)
- Hydrogen economy
- Hydrogen vehicle
