= Sonic Visualiser =

Audio analyser software

- Developer: Centre for Digital Music at Queen Mary, University of London
- Stable release: 5.2 / 7 March 2025; 13 months ago
- Written in: C++
- Operating system: Linux, MacOS, Windows
- Type: Audio analysis
- License: GPL-2.0-or-later
- Website: www.sonicvisualiser.org
- Repository: github.com/sonic-visualiser/sonic-visualiser

Sonic Visualiser is an application for viewing and analysing the contents of music audio files. It is a free software distributed under the GPL-2.0-or-later licence.

== History ==
Sonic Visualiser was developed at the Queen Mary University of London's Centre for Digital Music in 2007. It was written in C++ with Qt and released under the terms of the GNU GPL.

== Overview ==
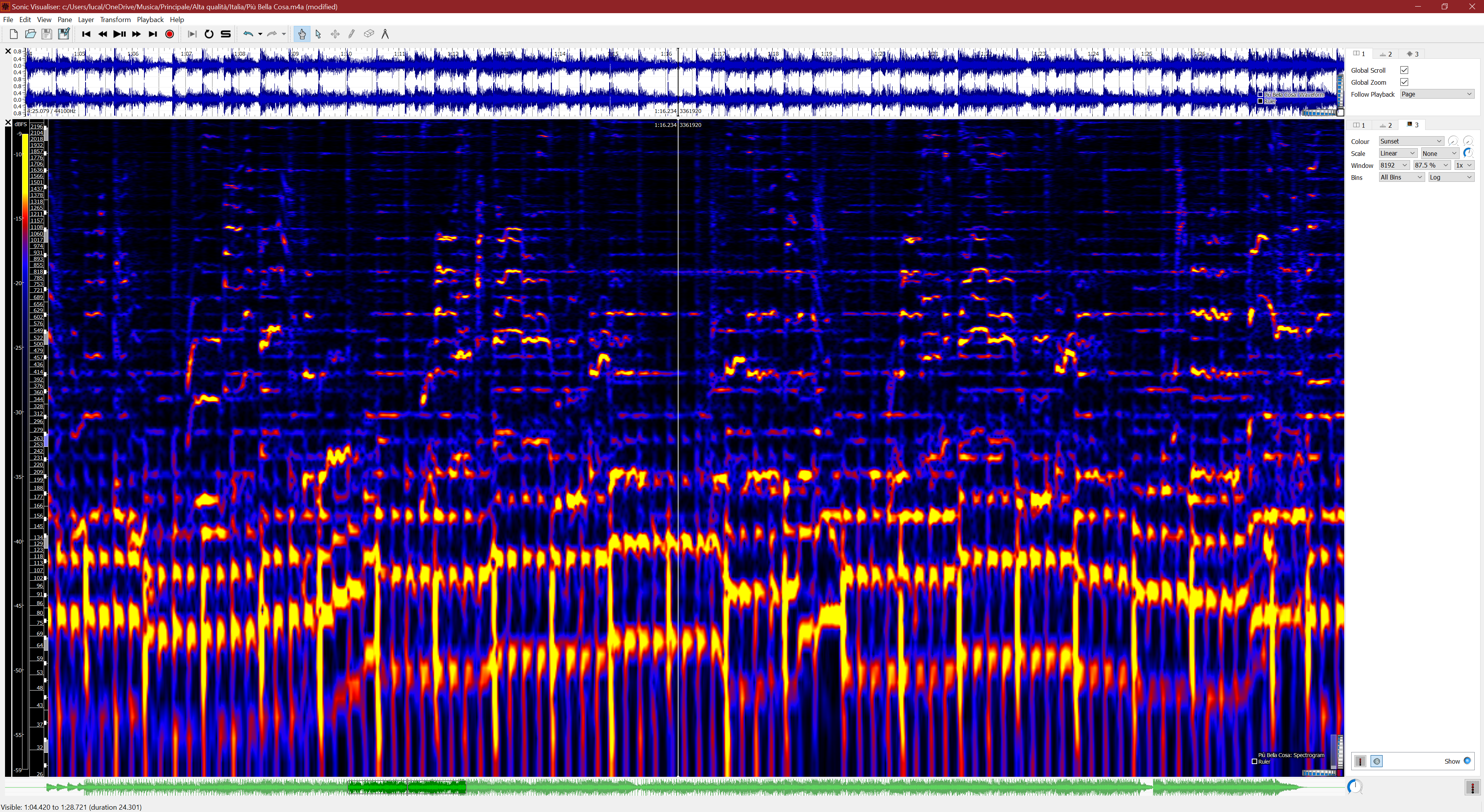
Screenshot of the spectrum of the refrain of a pop song (precisely "Più bella cosa" by Eros Ramazzotti): basses, drums and artist's voice can clearly be identified.

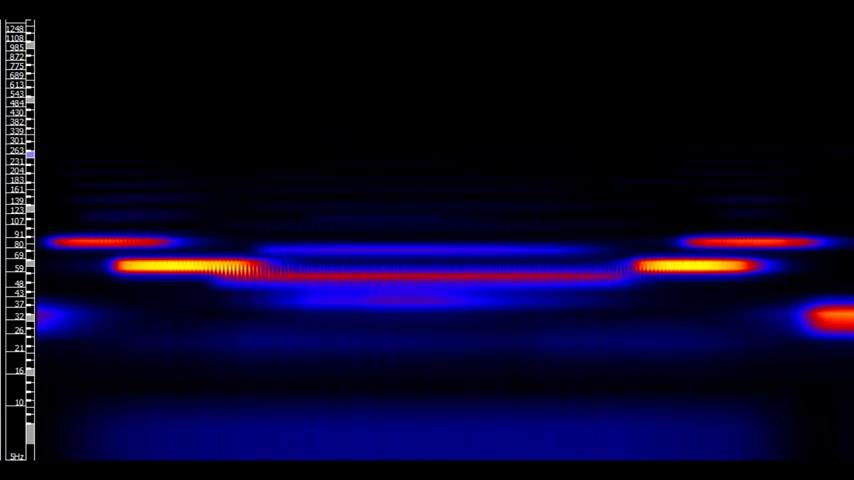
Sonic visualiser melodic range spectrogram example

Sonic Visualiser represents acoustic features of the audio file either as a waveform or as a spectrogram. A spectrogram is a heatmap, where the horizontal axis represents time, the vertical axis represents frequency, and the colors show presence of frequencies. The sharpness and smoothness of the spectrogram can be configured. There are three types of spectrogram:

- generic spectrogram
- melodic-range spectrogram
- peak-frequency spectrogram

Generic spectrogram covers the full frequency range and uses linear frequency scale. Melodic-range spectrogram covers the range which usually contains musical detail. Peak-frequency spectrogram performs phase difference calculations and estimates exact frequencies at each peak cell.

The interface consists of panes and layers. Panes allow to display multiple visualisations simultaneously, and they get aligned in the time axis. A pane can have multiple layers which are used for annotation. The user can configure color schemes for layers, and they can be navigated by clicking the labeled tabs.

There are multiple types of annotation layers which can be edited, including time instants, time-value plots, labels and images. Time instants do not have any associated value, and they can be used to annotate points (e.g. beat locations). Annotations allow the user to clarify relationships between musical parameters.

Sonic Visualiser supports third-party plugins in the Vamp plugin format. The plugins take audio input and parameters and return values for display. There are plugins which compute spectral flux and spectral centroid. Other plugins include automatic melody extraction, beat finding, chord analysis, etc.

Sonic Visualiser is available for Linux, OS X, and Windows operating systems.

== See also ==
- Comparison of free software for audio
- List of information graphics software
- Baudline
- Praat
