= Stream ripper =

Stream ripper may refer to:

- Stream recorder, a program for recording data streams
- Streamripper, a Stream recorder for audio streams
