= Tomahawk (software) =

Open source music player

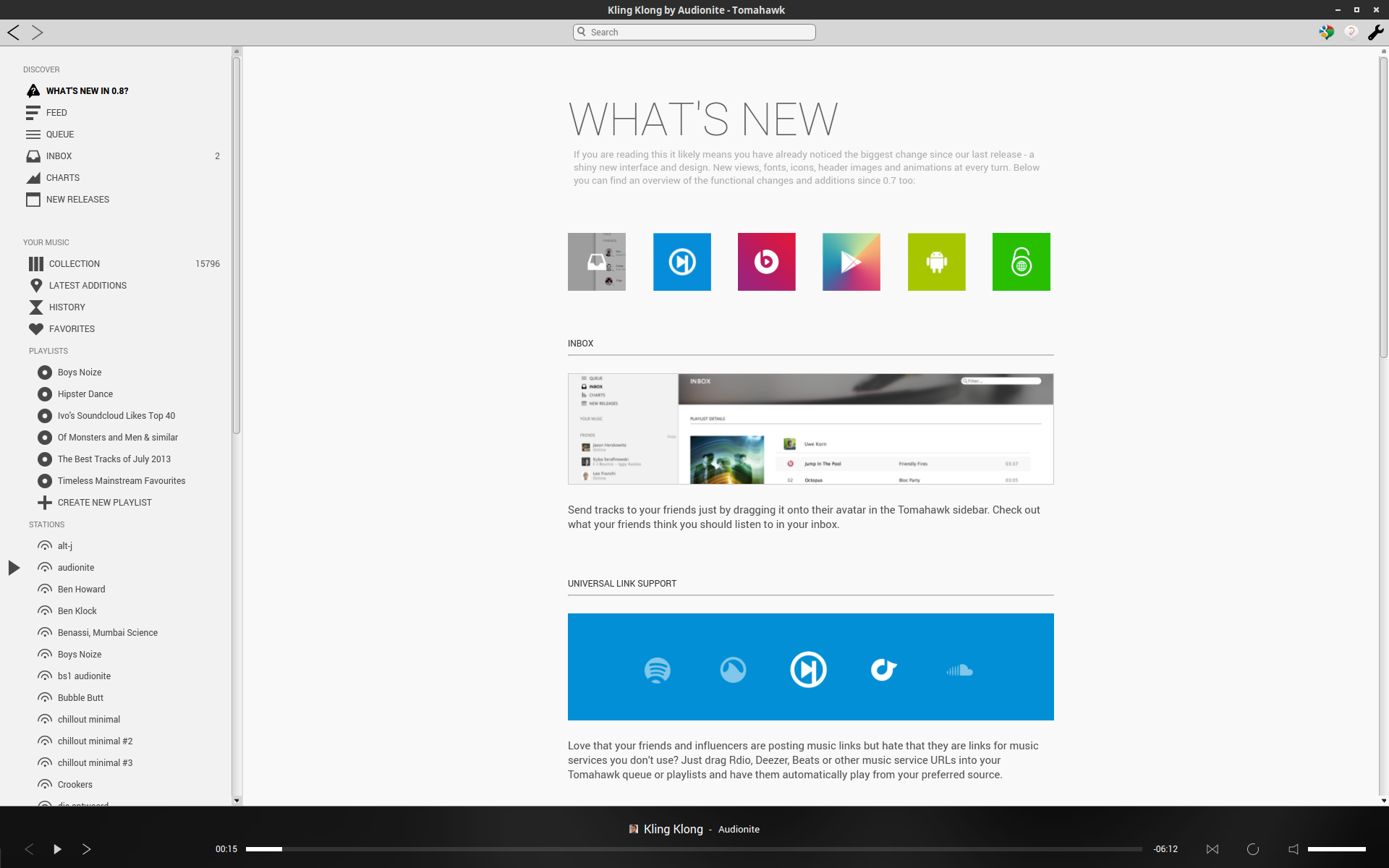
- Tomahawk 0.8.2 running on Linux Mint
- Original author: Christian Muehlhaeuser
- Release: 25 March 2011
- Preview release: 0.8.4 / April 29, 2015; 11 years ago
- Written in: C++ (Qt)
- Operating system: Linux, macOS, Microsoft Windows, FreeBSD, Android (Beta)
- Type: Audio player
- License: GPL-3.0-or-later
- Website: tomahawk-player.org
- Repository: https://github.com/tomahawk-player/tomahawk

Tomahawk was a free, open-source cross-platform music player for Windows, macOS and Linux. An Android beta client version was launched in June 2016. It focuses on the conglomeration of the user's music library across local and network collections as well as streaming services. The project was marked as abandoned by their authors on May 10, 2017.

== About ==
Tomahawk has a familiar iTunes-like interface. The left column offers access to playlists, search history, favorite tracks, charts, and other categories.

== Features ==
Tomahawk allows to install plug-ins for several different music services. These include:

- Spotify
- YouTube
- Jamendo
- Grooveshark
- Last.fm
- SoundCloud
- ownCloud
- 4shared
- Dilandau
- Official.fm
- Ampache
- Subsonic
- Google Play Music
- Beats Music
- Beets
- Rdio (currently Android only)
- Deezer (currently Android only)

== Toma.hk and Hatchet ==
In 2013, Tomahawk launched Toma.hk, a website that generates embeddable HTML code for songs and artists, allowing direct links to playable tracks online.

In March 2014, Tomahawk launched its cross-platform sync and social platform called "Hatchet" in beta. It provides users the ability to sync playlists and "loved" tracks across multiple devices. The service was planned to allow users to see what other users are listening to and share playlists through the Tomahawk application.

The last build was released in April 2015, after which progress stalled. In May 2017, developer Anton Romanov confirmed that the project is abandoned.

== See also ==
- List of Linux audio software
- Comparison of free software for audio § Players
