= Muine =

Open source audio player

Muine Music Player
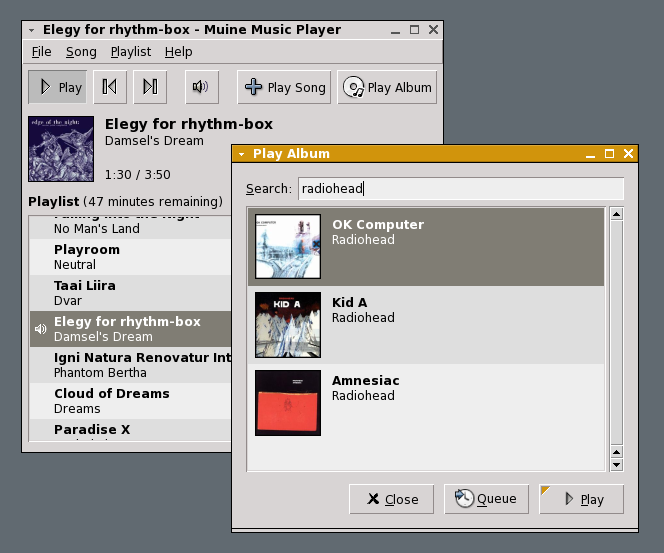
- Muine Music Player showing the Play Album dialog box.
- Developers: Peter Johanson, Jorn Baayen
- Repository: gitlab.gnome.org/Archive/muine.git
- Written in: C# (Mono)
- Operating system: Unix-like systems
- Type: Audio player
- License: GPL-2.0-or-later
- Website: gitlab.gnome.org/Archive/muine/

Muine is a discontinued audio player for the GNOME desktop environment which runs on Linux, Solaris, BSD and other UNIX-like systems. Muine is written in C# using Mono and Gtk#. The default backend is GStreamer framework but Muine can also use xine libraries.

== Features ==
- A simple, intuitive user interface
- Ogg Vorbis, FLAC and MP3 music playback support
- Automatic album-cover fetching
- Support for embedded ID3v2 album images
- ReplayGain support
- Support for multiple artist and performer tags per song
- A system tray icon
- Plugin support
- Translations into many languages

== See also ==
- Software audio players (free and open-source)
