= Streamtuner =

Streaming media directory browser

streamtuner
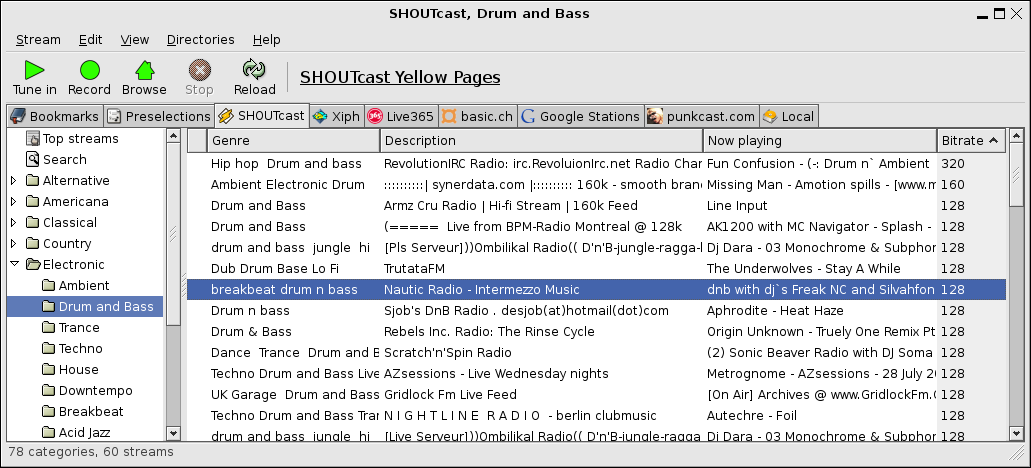
- Developer: Jean-Yves Lefort
- Stable release: 0.99.99 / December 21, 2004
- Operating system: Unix-like
- Type: Audio player
- License: revised BSD license
- Website: streamtuner

Streamtuner is a streaming media directory browser. Through the use of a C/Python plugin system, it offers a GTK+ 2.0 interface to Internet radio directories. Streamtuner does not actually play any files, it downloads a list of online radio streams and then tells the unix player (user's option) to play the selected stream. Streamtuner offers hundreds of thousands of music resources in a more common interface.

Streamtuner is free software, released under the terms of the revised BSD license.

There is also a version for the Nokia 770 Internet tablet.

The still developed Streamtuner2 mimics Streamtuner.

== Features of Streamtuner ==
- Browse the SHOUTcast Yellow Pages
- Browse the Live365 directory
- Browse the Xiph.org (aka icecast.org, aka Oddsock) directory
- Browse the basic.ch DJ mixes
- Manage your local music collection, with full support for ID3 and Vorbis metadata editing
- Listen to streams (through unix player), browse their web page, or record them using programs such as Streamripper
- Implement new directory handlers as tiny Python scripts or as dynamically loadable modules written in C
- Retain your favourite streams by bookmarking them
- Manually add streams to your collection

== Streamtuner in the press ==
- UnixReview.com: Marcel's Linux App of the Month: Streamtuner (July 2005)
- Tux Magazine: Streamtuner (July 2005)
- Schumann, Jorg; Schnober, Carsten (June 2004), Streamtuner, Linux Magazine, pp. 84–85
- Orange Crate: Audiophiles' Solution For Net Radio (April 2004)
