= LinuxSampler =

Music sampler

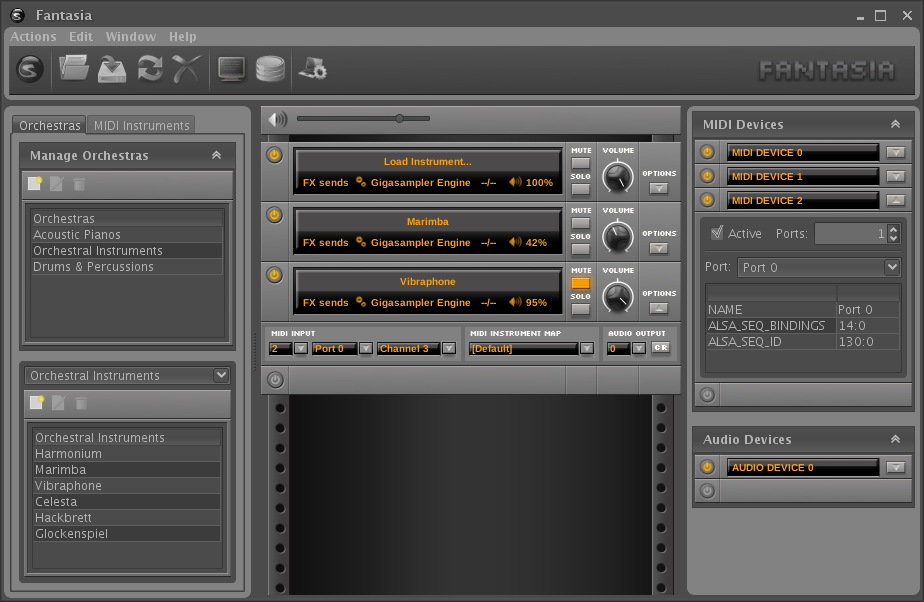
- Fantasia, a GUI frontend developed by JSampler
- Repository: svn.linuxsampler.org/cgi-bin/viewvc.cgi/
- Operating system: Linux, FreeBSD, OS X, Windows
- Type: Software sampler
- License: Freeware / Source available (code reuse restricted to non-commercial usage) most sub-components under GPL / LGPL
- Website: www.linuxsampler.org

LinuxSampler is music sampler software aiming to provide a pure software audio sampler with professional grade features comparable to both hardware and commercial software samplers, as well as to introduce new features not yet available by other samplers. Much of LinuxSampler is free software, but commercial reuse of some, such as the back-end, is restricted.

== Concept ==
LinuxSampler was designed as a sampler back-end, decoupled from any user interface. It provides a native C++ API as well as a network interface using an ASCII based protocol called LSCP for controlling the sampler and managing sampler sessions. Also, there are already two convenient frontends for LinuxSampler, QSampler and JSampler.

Due to the decoupled design the sampler can be controlled with the GUI frontend(s) even from another computer, probably even running another OS like Windows or OS X. SMP and cluster support is planned for future releases. There is a graphical instrument editor called gigedit, based on the GUI library GTK+, which can be used to edit and create Gigasampler format instruments and can either be used as a stand-alone application or in conjunction with LinuxSampler. The latter case allows to play and edit instruments at the same time, making all modifications with gigedit immediately audible, without having to reload the instruments into the sampler.

== Platforms ==
LinuxSampler, as the name indicates, was originally conceived to run on Linux, but thanks to the abstraction of audio and MIDI drivers and platform dependent functions, the sampler was successfully ported to Windows, OS X and FreeBSD.

The Windows version of LinuxSampler can work in standalone mode providing ASIO audio output and MME MIDI input, and as a VSTi plugin providing full integration with VST sequencers. The OS X version supports jackd audio output and CoreMIDI input. The Audio Unit interface (AU plugin) is in beta.

== Goals ==
It is planned to support all common sampler formats in LinuxSampler, but at the moment the work is concentrated on the Gigasampler format. Beside that, the goal is to design a new, sophisticated sampler format, more powerful and more flexible compared to any sampler format currently available in the world.

There is a feature list with more information about the current development plans available.

== Licensing ==
Most components are distributed as free software, under either the GNU General Public License or the GNU Lesser General Public License. However, the software license of the sampler backend prohibits commercial use. For commercial use, permission and terms must be sought from the developers. The backend is thus not free software. The ban on commercial use does not prohibit the use of LinuxSampler for commercial music production, which is explicitly allowed.

== See also ==
- Comparison of free software for audio
- List of Linux audio software
