= Snack Sound Toolkit =

- Original author: Kåre Sjölander
- Developer: Swedish Royal Technical University
- Website: www.speech.kth.se/snack/
- Repository: www.speech.kth.se/snack/download.html

The Snack Sound Toolkit is a cross-platform library written by Kåre Sjölander of the Swedish Royal Technical University (KTH) with bindings for the scripting languages Tcl, Python, and Ruby. It provides audio I/O, audio analysis and processing functions, such as spectral analysis, pitch tracking, and filtering, and related graphics functions such as display of the sound pressure waveform and spectrogram. It is available on Microsoft Windows, Linux, Mac OS X, Solaris, HP-UX, FreeBSD, NetBSD, and IRIX.

== Usage ==
The Snack Sound Toolkit is used in a number of linguistic research tools, including WaveSurfer, Transcriber, and SndBite, as well as in other applications, such as the snackAmp MP3 music player. It was used in academic research at the Delft University of Technology. The Springer collection Perception in Multimodal Dialogue Systems includes a research essay utilizing Snack for human-computer speech interaction. The toolkit is included as a component of ActiveState's Tcl and Python distributions.
