= Integra Live =

Open-source sound design software

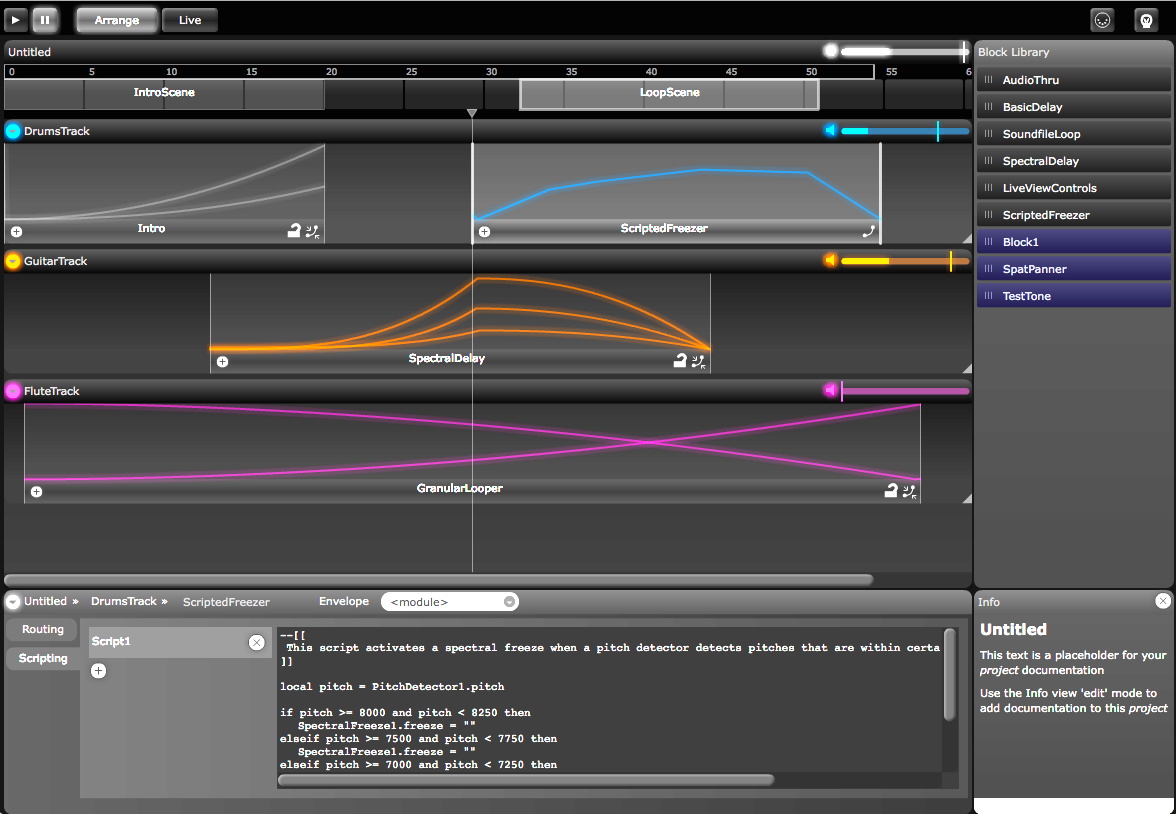
- Screenshot of Integra Live 1.6.4
- Initial release: 2010
- Stable release: 1.7.11 / October 2, 2017
- Written in: C++, Adobe Flex (Framework), Pure Data
- Operating system: OS X, Microsoft Windows
- Type: Modular systems
- License: GPL-2.0-or-later

Integra Live is an open-source software for interactive sound design developed and maintained by the Integra Lab at Birmingham Conservatoire, part of Birmingham City University. This software processes audio inputs from a computer's audio interface or an audio file and supports various audio transformations. It is utilized in live performances and studio environments for sound creation and music composition. Integra Live is supported on PC computers running the Microsoft Windows operating system and on Apple computers running OS X.

== History ==
=== Origins of Integra Live ===
Integra Live originated as the Integra Environment proposed as one of the outcomes of the first phase of the Integra Project (Integra 1), which ran from 5/9/2005 to 4/9/2008. The aim of the Integra Environment was to create a "new software environment for the composition and performance of live electronic music" that would "simplify, standardize and humanize the use of live, interactive music technologies". With regard to the aim to "standardize", Lamberto Coccioli, co-author of the original Integra bid and Project Manager of the Integra Project, stated in 2006 that "...We have to think of technology as just another instrument that needs to be played..." and "...just as you write for instrument combinations that are readily available around the world, the same should happen with technology. You should use tools that are more or less standardized...".

Most of the development resources in Integra 1 were devoted to exploring ways to describe audio processing setups, and store audio processing parameter states in an implementation-independent manner. This resulted in the development of libIntegra, a library originally written in C. libIntegra is capable of de-serialising XML files used to describe audio module interfaces, reading and writing module state, instantiating modules within a given audio module host via a 'bridge' architecture, and presenting an external API to its functionality.

In the final year of the Integra 1 project, several GUI prototypes were developed for the Integra Environment by the Integra Canadian partner CIRMMT. One of these, the Integra GUI, was developed in the Max/MSP environment by Sean Fergusson, Marlon Schumacher and Geof Holbrook and contained a number of features that were later incorporated into the Integra Live design such as the inclusion of a separate "Performance Pane", a high-level module library, single-level containers for modules (Events), a module "Routing Pane", and the association of breakpoint control curves for module parameters with Events.

=== Early Development of Integra Live ===
The early development of Integra Live took place as part of the second phase of the Integra Project (Integra 2), which ran from 1/12/2008 to 11/30/2011. Integra 2 involved a more substantial and structured software development programme, building on that of Integra 1. Development responsibilities were assigned as follows amongst the project Scientific partners:

- Birmingham Conservatoire: Leighton Hargreaves (GUI developer), Jamie Bullock (lead developer and development manager)
- Institut für Elektronische Musik und Akustik (IEM): Thomas Musil and IOhannes Zmoelnig (Pure Data module developers)
- Muzyka Centrum: Krzysztof Trzewiczek (module controls developer)
- Malmö Academy of Music: Henrik Frisk (XML formats and concept developer)
- NOTAM: Kjetil Matheussen (scripting developer)

In addition, the project commissioned the services of design company Less Rain and involved Birmingham City University's now-defunct User Lab facility. In the early stages of Integra 2, Jamie Bullock produced a formal design requirements document in collaboration with Daniel Beattie (of Less Rain) and Lamberto Coccioli, the Integra 2 Project director. The document detailed the design vision for the project alongside results from a survey of 76 potential users and 4 user interviews. An up-front design was then commissioned from Less Rain based on the requirements provided. The design included a complete set of wireframes outlining the functionality of the software and a number of visual design mockups illustrating the intended look and feel of the software.

=== Version 1.0 ===
The first public release of Integra Live was made on July 30, 2010 when the software entered its open beta development phase. The version 1.0.x series of releases was for Mac OS X only, (version 10.4 upwards) and required users to manually install the Adobe AIR runtime. The software was released as a ZIP archive containing the software ".app" bundle and a PDF "Quick Start Guide".

=== Version 1.2 ===
In version 1.2.x the application remained Mac OS X only, supporting OS X (Intel) 10.5 or later. It included a significant number of improvements including the use of Adobe's AIR installer system, removing the need for users to manually install the AIR runtime.

Version 1.2.x was the final version to be released during the Integra Project. It was used by the BBC Symphony Orchestra to perform the 'live electronics' elements in a performance of Jonathan Harvey's Madonna of Winter and Spring on January 28, 2012.

=== Version 1.3 ===
After the Integra Project ended, the development of the Integra Live software continued at Birmingham Conservatoire, with Leighton Hargreaves developing the GUI and Jamie Bullock developing the libIntegra library, Integra module library and module host. Hargreaves also developed a Windows-specific build system and installer.

Version 1.3.x was released in June 2012 and was the first release to feature both Windows and Mac OS Versions. The Mac version made use of Adobe's "captive runtime" to distribute the Adobe AIR runtime within the .app bundle and avoid the requirement for an installer.

=== Version 1.5 ===
Version 1.5 was released in January 2013 and introduced a new "Info View" to the software. The Info View displays contextual information to users based on the UI element currently under the cursor. The Info View is significant, being the first major UI component to be introduced that was not specified in the original Integra 2 Project design phase.

== See also ==
- List of free software for audio
