= Seq24 =

MIDI music sequencer software

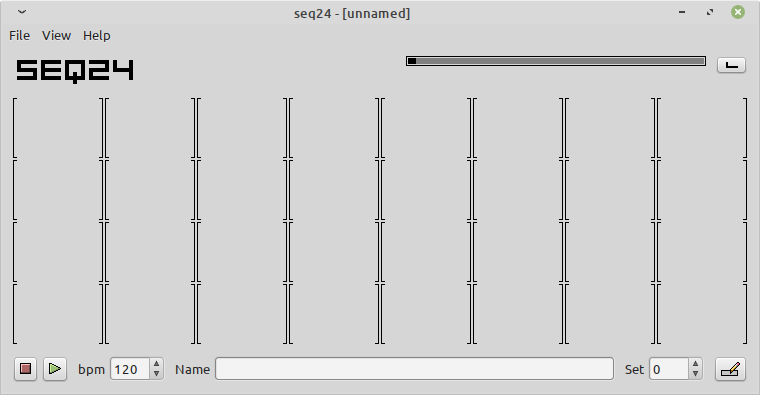
- The default window of Seq24 0.9.3, running on Linux Mint 20 Xfce
- Original author: Rob Buse
- Developer: Seq24team
- Stable release: v.0.9.3 / January 24, 2016
- Written in: C++
- Operating system: Linux, Microsoft Windows
- Size: 1.3MB
- Type: MIDI music sequencer
- License: GPL-2.0-or-later
- Website: filter24.org/seq24/about.html

Seq24 is a software MIDI music sequencer that runs under Linux and Microsoft Windows. Written in C++, it is designed to be simple to use and appropriate for live performance.

Distributed under the terms of the GPL-2.0-or-later license, Seq24 is free software.

Seq24 is intended to be similar to hardware sequencers/samplers such as the Akai MPC line of instruments. It works by sequencing smaller sequences or loops of MIDI notes and performance information into larger music sequences in a manner similar to the way in which Sony's Acid software is used to sequence audio clips. In order to do this, it has a patterns panel, a pattern editor and a song editor. Sequences are saved as Standard MIDI file format, type 1.

While developed from 2002 to 2006 by Rob Buse, a team (calling themselves simply 'Seq24team') picked up the project in 2008 with Rob's blessing, and resumed work with release 0.8.8.

== Forks ==
Several follow-up forks and reworks of the original tool exist, listed below:

- seq42, oriented on song editing, rather than live performance. Original version is no longer maintained.
- sequencer64, seq24 heart with 6 years of extensions.
- seq66, a major refactoring with pattern banks, playlists, piano roll, song layout, MIDI control/status for live performance etc., Qt based.
- seq192, "with less features but more swag".

== See also ==
- Free audio software
