= Transcriber =

Open-source software for transcription and annotation of recorded speech

- Stable release: 1.5.1 / June 6, 2005
- Written in: Tcl/Tk, C
- Operating system: Cross-platform
- License: GPL
- Website: transag.sourceforge.net

Transcriber is an open-source software tool for the transcription and annotation of speech signals for linguistic research. It supports multiple hierarchical layers of segmentation, named entity annotation, speaker lists, topic lists, and overlapping speakers. Two views of the sound pressure waveform at different resolutions may be viewed simultaneously. Various character encodings, including Unicode, are supported.

Annotations from Transcriber may be exported in XML. OASIS' Cover Pages publishes the open DTD used by Transcriber.

Transcriber is written in Tcl/Tk with the Snack audio library and is therefore available on most major platforms. It is distributed under the GNU General Public License. Transcriber has been superseded by TranscriberAG.

== Bibliography ==
- C. Barras; E. Geoffrois; Z. Wu & M. Liberman (January 2000). "Transcriber: development and use of a tool for assisting speech corpora production". Speech Communication. 33 (1–2).
- E. Geoffrois; C. Barras; S. Bird & Z. Wu (May–June 2000). "Transcribing with Annotation Graphs". Second International Conference on Language Resources and Evaluation (LREC): 1517–1521.
- C. Barras; E. Geoffrois; Z. Wu & M. Liberman (May 1998). "Transcriber: a Free Tool for Segmenting, Labeling and Transcribing Speech" (PDF). First International Conference on Language Resources and Evaluation (LREC): 1373–1376.
