= ZynAddSubFX =

Software synthesizer

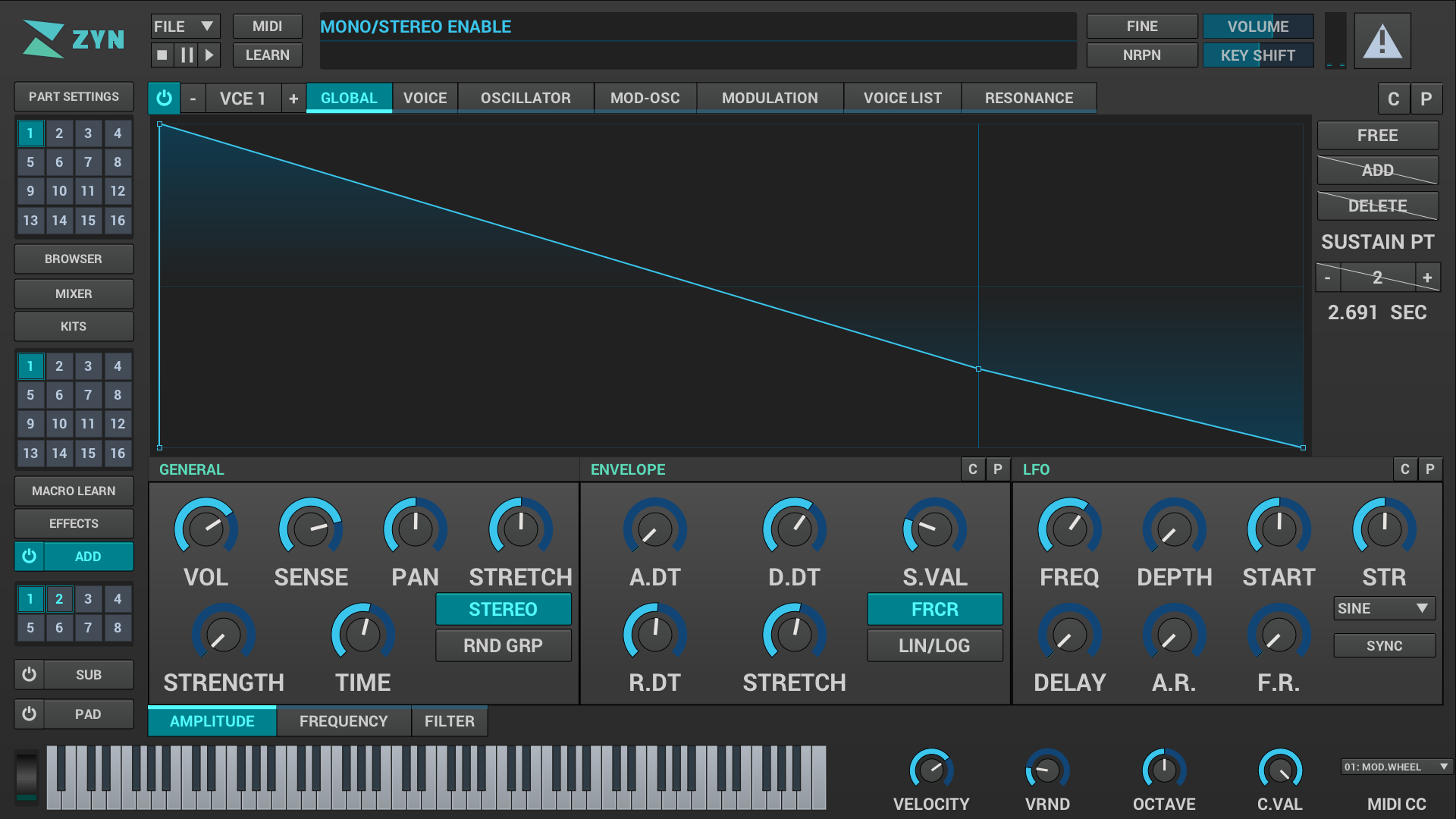
- ZynAddSubFX on Linux
- Original author: Nasca Octavian Paul
- Developers: Mark McCurry, Harald Hvaal
- Initial release: September 25, 2002
- Stable release: 3.0.6 / January 21, 2022; 4 years ago
- Repository: sourceforge.net/projects/zynaddsubfx/
- Written in: C++
- Operating system: BSD, Linux, Mac OS X, Windows
- Size: 8.0MB
- Available in: English
- Type: Synthesizer
- License: GPL-2.0-or-later
- Website: zynaddsubfx.sourceforge.net

ZynAddSubFX (also now called Zyn-Fusion) is a free and open-source software synthesizer for Linux, Mac OS X and Microsoft Windows. Version 3's new user interface was initially released under proprietary terms, but is now open source (though prebuilt binaries are still sold to fund development).

For sound generation it has three hybrid synth engines that combine additive, subtractive, Fourier and other synthesis methods. No external samples are used to produce the sound; everything is done by synthesis. The synthesizer has effects like reverberation, echo, chorus, distortion, equalization and others, and supports microtonal tunings.

The original author of ZynAddSubFX is Romanian programmer Nasca Octavian Paul. The project was started in March 2002 and the first public version (1.0.0) was released on September 25, 2002. Since 2009, the new maintainer is Mark McCurry.

== Sound generation ==
ZynAddSubFX combines several different methods of audio synthesis in order to create sounds: additive synthesis by the ADSynth engine, subtractive synthesis by the SUBSynth engine, and an original algorithm used to generate wavetables in the PADSynth engine.

== Music made with ZynAddSubFX ==
ZynAddSubFX was featured in the KVR One-Synth-Challenge contest.

In November 2013, Unfa released an album that was entirely made with ZynAddSubFX. Slavonic pagan ambient project Svitlo albums were created using ZynAddSubFX as synthesizer.

== See also ==
- Free audio software
- Linux audio software
