= SoX =

Cross-platform free software digital audio editor

Sound eXchange
- Developers: Chris Bagwell, et al.
- Initial release: July 1991; 34 years ago
- Stable release: 14.4.2 / 22 February 2015; 11 years ago
- Written in: C
- Operating system: Cross-platform: Windows, Linux, OS X
- Type: Audio editing software
- License: GPL-2.0-or-later; LGPL-2.1-or-later
- Website: sourceforge.net/projects/sox/
- Repository: sox.git.sourceforge.net/gitroot/sox/sox

Sound eXchange (SoX) is a cross-platform audio editing software. It has a command-line interface, and is written in standard C. It is free software, licensed under GPL-2.0-or-later, with libsox licensed under LGPL-2.1-or-later, and distributed by Chris Bagwell through SourceForge.

== History ==
SoX was created in July 1991 by Lance Norskog and posted to the Usenet group alt.sources as Aural eXchange: Sound sample translator. With the second release (in November the same year) it was renamed Sound Exchange. Norskog continued to maintain and release SoX via Usenet, File Transfer Protocol (FTP), and then the web until early 1995, at which time SoX was at version 11 (gamma). In May 1996, Chris Bagwell started to maintain and release updated versions of SoX, starting with version sox-11gamma-cb. In September 2000, Bagwell registered the project at SourceForge with project name "sox". The registration was announced on 4 September 2000 and SoX 12.17 was released on 7 September 2000.

Throughout its history SoX has had many contributing authors; Guido van Rossum, best known as creator of the programming language Python, was a significant contributor in SoX's early days.

Code updates at SourceForge have stopped 2015 with version 14.4.2. The sox_ng project bundles bug fixes and new features from several sources, and is used by many distributions to provide the package.

== Features ==
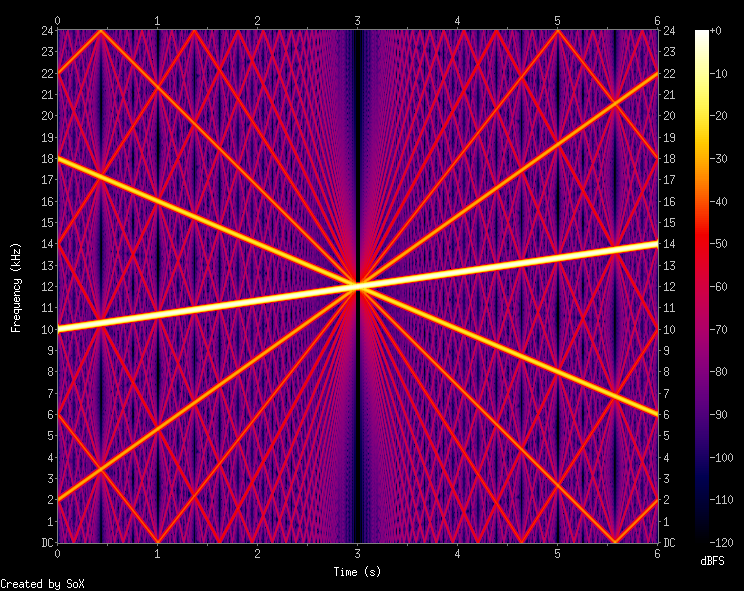
A SoX spectrogram

Some of SoX's features are:

- Cross-platform (Windows, Linux, Solaris, OS X, et al.)
- Reading and writing Au, WAV, AIFF, MP3 (via an external LAME MP3 encoder), Ogg Vorbis, FLAC and other audio file formats
- Recording and playing audio (on many systems); playing via URL (internet file or stream)
- Editing via concatenate, trim, pad, repeat, reverse, volume, fade, splice, normalise
- Processing via chorus, flanger, echo, phaser, compressor, delay, filter (high-pass, low-pass, shelving, etc.)
- Adjustment of speed (pitch and tempo), pitch (without tempo), tempo (without pitch), and sample rate
- Noise removal using frequency profiling, implemented since December 2004
- Silent passage removal
- Simple audio synthesis
- Generating White noise, Pink noise, and Brown noise
- Multi-file & multi-track mixing
- Multi-file merging (e.g., 2 mono to 1 stereo)
- Statistical analysis; spectrogram analysis

== Examples ==
SoX being used to process some audio:

$ sox track1.wav track1-processed.flac remix - norm -3
 highpass 22 gain -3 rate 48k norm -3 dither

Input File     : 'track1.wav'
Channels       : 2
Sample Rate    : 44100
Precision      : 16-bit
Duration       : 00:02:54.97 = 7716324 samples = 13123 CDDA sectors
Sample Encoding: 16-bit Signed Integer PCM
Endian Type    : little

Output File    : 'track1-processed.flac'
Channels       : 1
Sample Rate    : 48000
Precision      : 16-bit
Duration       : 00:02:54.97 = 8398720 samples ~ 13123 CDDA sectors
Sample Encoding: 16-bit FLAC

sox: effects chain: input      44100Hz 2 channels 16 bits (multi)
sox: effects chain: remix      44100Hz 2 channels 16 bits (multi)
sox: effects chain: norm       44100Hz 1 channels 16 bits
sox: effects chain: highpass   44100Hz 1 channels 16 bits
sox: effects chain: gain       44100Hz 1 channels 16 bits (multi)
sox: effects chain: rate       44100Hz 1 channels 16 bits
sox: effects chain: norm       48000Hz 1 channels 16 bits
sox: effects chain: dither     48000Hz 1 channels 16 bits (multi)
sox: effects chain: output     48000Hz 1 channels 16 bits (multi) 

Playing some audio files:

$ play *.ogg

01 - Summer's Cauldron.ogg:

  Encoding: Vorbis
  Channels: 2 @ 16-bit   Track: 01 of 15
Samplerate: 44100Hz      Album: Skylarking
Album gain: -7.8dB      Artist: XTC
  Duration: 00:03:19.99  Title: Summer's Cauldron

In:20.8% 00:00:41.61 [00:02:38.38] Out:1.84M [  ====|====  ]        Clip:0 

Generating Brown noise:

$ play -n synth brown
play WARN alsa: can't encode 0-bit Unknown or not applicable

 File Size: 0         
  Encoding: n/a           
  Channels: 1 @ 32-bit   
Samplerate: 48000Hz      
Replaygain: off         
  Duration: unknown      

In:0.00% 00:00:17.41 [00:00:00.00] Out:836k  [!=====|=====!] Hd:0.0 Clip:0 

== Vulnerabilities ==
SoX has had several vulnerabilities listed in the National Vulnerability Database since its last public release in 2015. These vulnerabilities include stack and heap overflows and denial-of-service attacks.

== See also ==
- Digital audio
- Audio file format
- Audio signal processing
- Multitrack recording
- Audio mastering
- Sample rate conversion
- Free audio software
- List of Linux audio software
