= Gnaural =

Binaural-beat generator

- Stable release: 1.0.20110606 (June 6, 2011; 15 years ago) [±]
- Written in: Java (programming language)
- Type: Brainwave entrainment
- License: GPL-2.0-or-later
- Website: sourceforge.net/projects/gnaural/

Gnaural is brainwave entrainment software for Microsoft Windows, Mac OS X, and Linux licensed under GPL-2.0-or-later. Gnaural is free software for creating binaural beats intended to be used as personal brainwave synchronization software, for scientific research, or by professionals.

Gnaural allows for the creation of binaural beat tracks specifying different frequencies and exporting tracks into different audio formats. Gnaural runnings can also be linked over the internet, allowing synchronous sessions between many users.

== See also ==
- Brainwave Entrainment
- Binaural beats
- Linux audio software
