= MP3Gain =

Volume normalization software

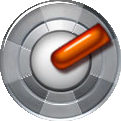

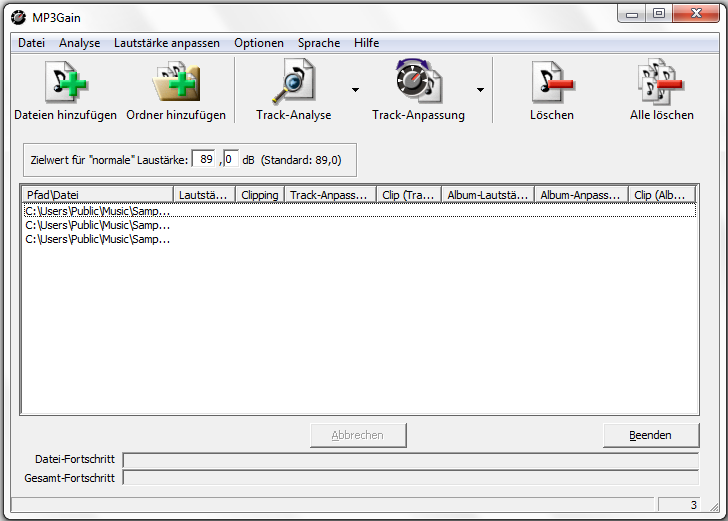
- MP3Gain 1.2.5 screenshot on Windows 7
- Developer(s): Glen Sawyer
- Preview release: 1.3.5 (not yet to be found) [±]
- Repository: sourceforge.net/projects/mp3gain/files/
- Written in: C
- Operating system: Cross-platform
- Available in: English, Bulgarian, Catalan, Czech, Chinese (Simplified), Chinese (Traditional), Croatian, Dutch, Finnish, French, German, Greek, Hebrew, Hungarian, Italian, Japanese, Korean, Polish, Portuguese, Romanian, Russian, Serbian, Slovak, Spanish, Thai, Turkish, Uzbek
- Type: Audio normalizer
- License: GNU LGPL 2.1+
- Website: mp3gain.sourceforge.net

MP3Gain is an audio normalization software tool. The tool is available on multiple platforms and is free software. It analyzes the MP3 and reversibly changes its volume. The volume can be adjusted for single files or as album where all files would have the same perceived loudness. It is an implementation of ReplayGain. In 2015 Debian and Ubuntu removed it from their repositories due to a lack of an active maintainer.

== MP3Gain Technical details ==
MP3Gain first computes the desired gain (volume adjustment), either per track or per album, using the ReplayGain algorithm. It then modifies the overall volume scale factor in each MP3 frame, and writes undo information as a tag (in APEv2, or ID3v2 format) making this a reversible process. The scale factor modification can be reversed using the information in the added tag and the tag may be removed. MP3Gain does not introduce any digital generation loss because it does not decode and re-encode the file.

== AACGain Technical details ==
MP3Gain is unable to change the volume on AAC or MP4 files. A mod called AACGain exists that can be used as super-set drop-in replacement in most front-ends originally created for MP3Gain. The audio file must be AAC inside a MP4 format container and not raw AAC data file.
