= EasyEffects =

Software effect processor

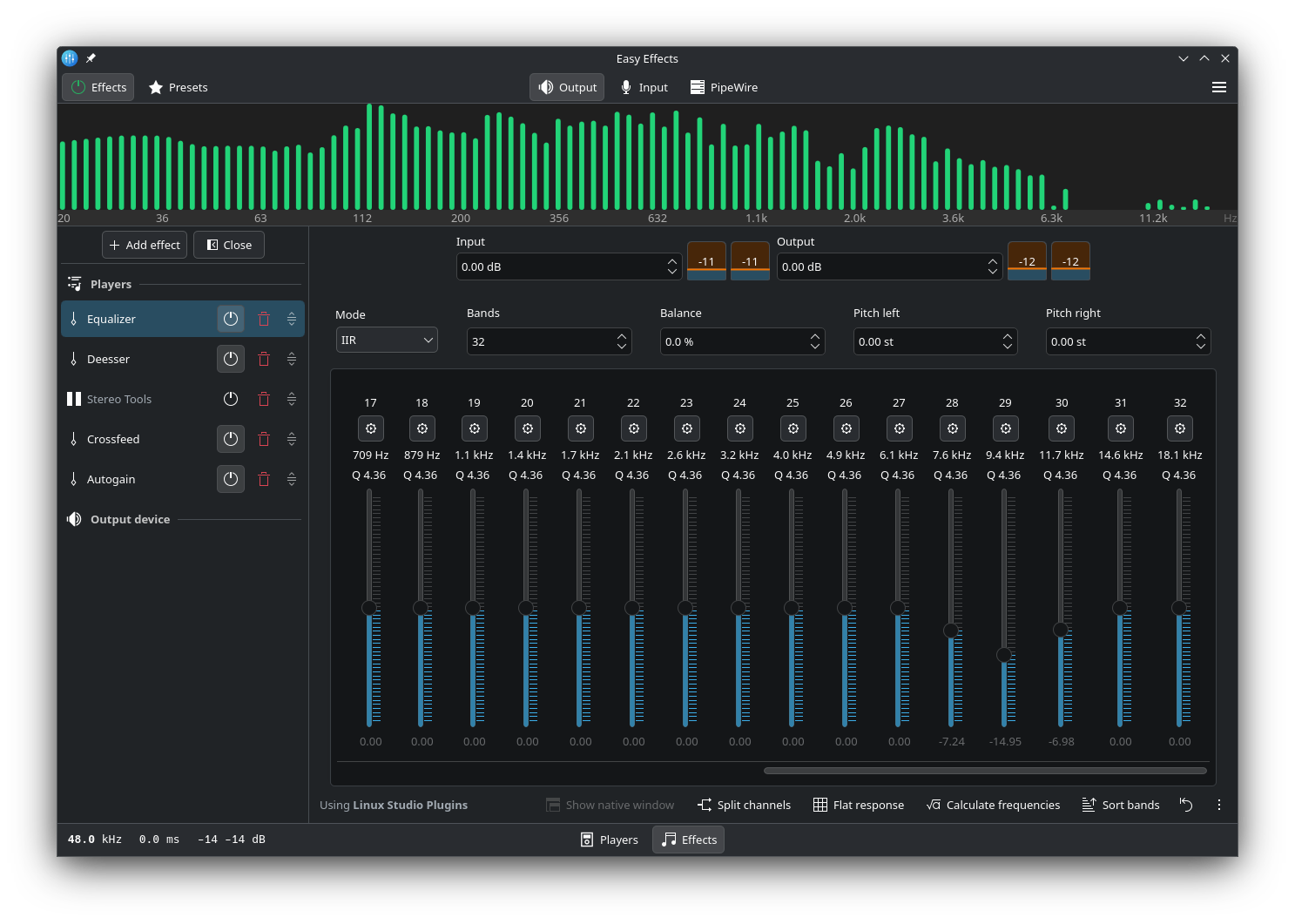
- Developer: Wellington Wallace
- Stable release: 8.0.0 / 9 November 2025; 14 March 2026
- Written in: Legacy: C++; Current: C++, QML
- Operating system: Unix-like
- Platform: Legacy: GTK; Current: Qt
- Available in: 12 languages
- List of languages Croatian, Czech, English, French, German, Indonesian, Italian, Polish, Portuguese, Russian, Slovak, Swedish
- Type: Audio effect processor
- License: GPL-3.0-or-later
- Website: wwmm.github.io/easyeffects/
- Repository: github.com/wwmm/easyeffects

EasyEffects (formerly known as PulseEffects) is a free and open-source Qt application for Unix-like systems which provides a large array of audio effects and filters to apply to input and output audio streams.

The application originally used the Pulseaudio sound server as it allowed effects to be added to audio streams with ease, however, now runs exclusively on the PipeWire sound server after a port in 2021.

The application also switched to using the Qt toolkit in version v8.0.0.

It is published under the GPL-3.0-or-later license.

== Overview ==
EasyEffects uses PipeWire to process incoming and outgoing audio streams independently and can apply various sound effects in the form of plug-ins made by different developer teams such as Calf Studio Gear, MDA.LV2 and GStreamer. All plugins have their own presets and can be applicable inside the suite rather than having to use a different mixer or executing a script from the command line.

Available output effects are limiter, auto volume, compressor of dynamic range, filter, 30 bands parametric equalizer, bass enhancer, exciter, reverbation, crossfeed, delay, maximizer and spectrum analyzer. Available input effects are WebRTC, limiter, compressor, filter, equalizer, de-esser, reverbation, pitch shift and spectrum analyzer.
