= FreqTweak =

Audio spectral manipulation software

- Developer: FreqTweak team
- Stable release: 0.7.2 / July 11, 2009; 17 years ago
- Preview release: ? scr-only / July 4, 2010; 16 years ago
- Written in: C++
- Operating system: Linux
- Type: Audio software
- License: GPL
- Website: https://freqtweak.sourceforge.net/

FreqTweak is an open-source tool for real-time audio spectral manipulation and display. It is free software, available under the GNU General Public License. FreqTweak can (and is supposed to) be connected to other audio software using the JACK Audio Connection Kit.

== Description ==
FreqTweak is FFT-based, and supports up to four channels. An FFT analysis is applied to each audio channel, and every individual frequency band can have a different effect applied to it. In version 0.6.1 the following effects are available:

- EQ cut/boost
- Pitch scaling
- Gate
- Compressor
- Delay
- Limit
- Warp
