= Baudline =

Signal analyser

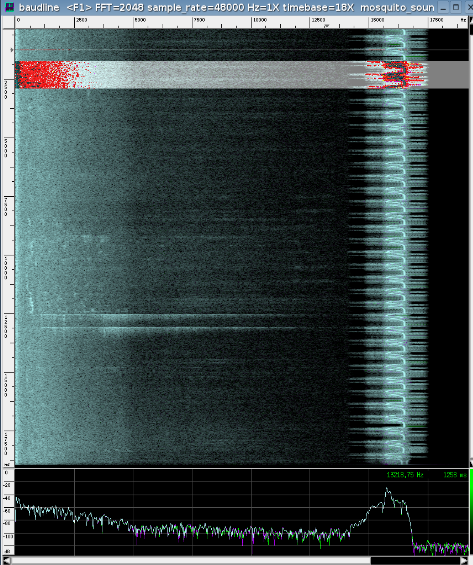
- Baudline Signal Analyzer
- Developer: SigBlips DSP Engineering
- Initial release: September 2000; 25 years ago
- Written in: C
- Operating system: FreeBSD, Linux, Mac OS X, Solaris
- Type: numerical analysis
- License: proprietary subscription
- Website: www.baudline.com

The Baudline time-frequency browser is a discontinued signal analysis tool designed for scientific visualization. It runs on several Unix-like operating systems under the X Window System. Baudline is useful for real-time spectral monitoring, collected signals analysis, generating test signals, making distortion measurements, and playing back audio files.

== Applications ==
- Acoustic cryptanalysis
- Audio codec lossy compression analysis
- Audio signal processing
- Bioacoustics research
- Data acquisition (DAQ)
- Gravitational Wave analysis
- Infrasound monitoring
- Musical acoustics
- Radar
- Seismic data processing
- SETI
- Signal analysis
- Software Defined Radio
- Spectral analysis
- Very low frequency (VLF) reception
- WWV frequency measurement

== Features ==
- Spectrogram, Spectrum, Waveform, and Histogram displays
- Fourier, Correlation, and Raster transforms
- SNR, THD, SINAD, ENOB, SFDR distortion measurements
- Channel equalization
- Function generator
- Digital down converter
- Audio playing with real-time DSP effects like speed control, pitch scaling, frequency shifting, matrix surround panning, filtering, and digital gain boost
- Audio recording of multiple channels
- JACK Audio Connection Kit sound server support
- Import AIFF, AU, WAV, FLAC, MP3, Ogg Vorbis, AVI, MOV, and other file formats

== License ==
The old Baudline version comes with no warranty and is free to download. The binaries may be used for any purpose, though no form of redistribution is permitted. The new baudline version is available via a subscription model and site license.

== See also ==
- Linux audio software
- List of information graphics software
- List of numerical analysis software
- Digital signal processing
