= OggConvert =

Audio and video transcoder

- Developer(s): Tristan Brindle
- Final release: 0.3.3 / May 24, 2010; 15 years ago
- Written in: Python
- Operating system: Linux, experimental Windows version
- Platform: GNOME
- Available in: around 30 languages
- Type: Transcoding
- License: LGPL-2.1-or-later
- Website: oggconvert.tristanb.net (down)

OggConvert is a free and open-source transcoder for digital audio and video files of various types into the free Ogg Vorbis audio format, and the Theora, VP8 and Dirac video formats. It supports Ogg, Matroska and WebM containers for output. It is developed by a single author, primarily for Linux. A number of community translations exist for the software.

OggConvert is nominally a GNOME utility, but depends only on the GStreamer Python bindings package and uses GTK+ libraries, allowing it to run in a number of desktop environments. An Experimental Windows version exists and limited support is offered for Solaris and macOS, as the author is unable to test on these platforms.

OggConvert uses a point and click interface, requiring the selection of a file and format to convert to. Providing a gstreamer plugin exists for the media you want to convert, it supports a wide variety of file types.

OggConvert is available to download from the author's page as packaged files for Ubuntu, Fedora, Debian and Windows. The source code is also available.
