= Impro-Visor =

Music notation software for jazz solo

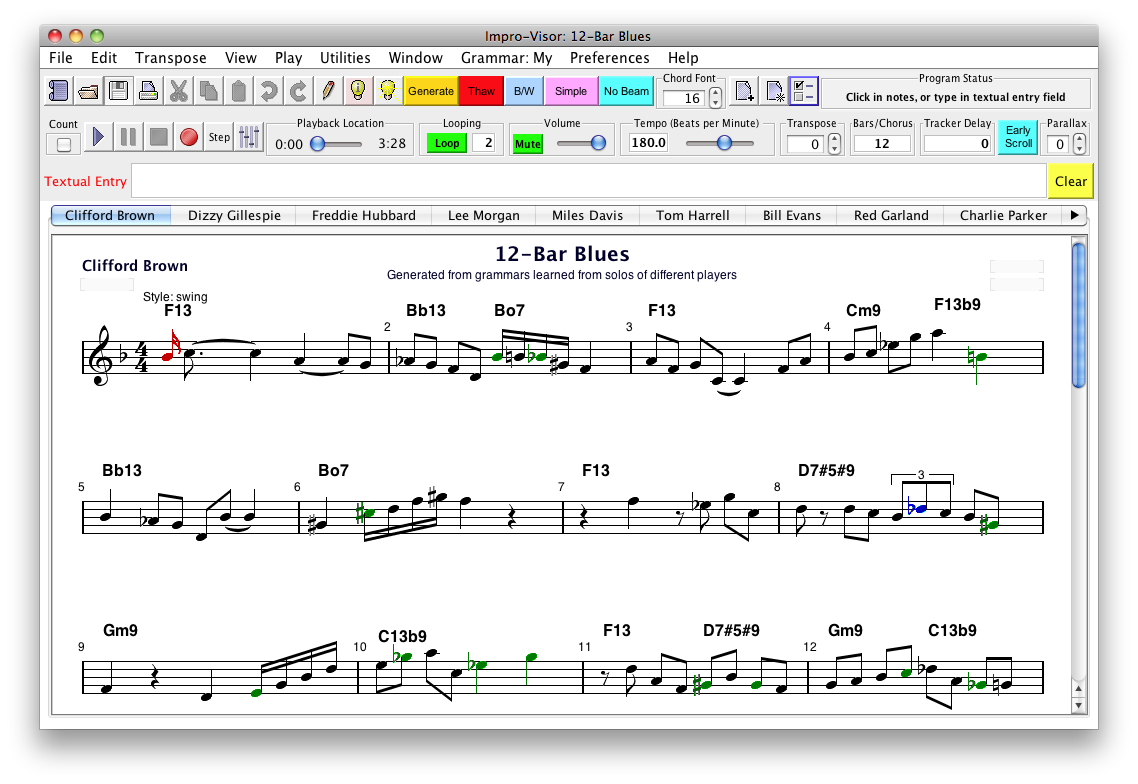
- Developers: Robert M. (Bob) Keller and others at Harvey Mudd College and elsewhere
- Release: 2006 March
- Stable release: 10.2 / August 1, 2019; 7 years ago
- Operating system: Windows, macOS, Linux
- Type: Scorewriter
- License: GPL-2.0-or-later
- Website: cs.hmc.edu/~keller/jazz/improvisor/
- Repository: github.com/Impro-Visor/Impro-Visor

Impro-Visor is an educational tool for creating and playing a lead sheet, with a particular orientation toward representing jazz solos.

== Improvisation Advisor ==
The philosophy of Impro-Visor is to provide a tool to help musicians construct jazz solos over chord progressions. It includes a database capability for creating, saving, and recalling licks, as well as a lick generation capability based on a user-modifiable grammar. More recent versions of Impro-Visor include auto-generated playback accompaniment in various styles, and a style extraction (from MIDI) capability. Most musical knowledge, including lick generation, database, lead sheets, styles, and other information, is represented as text files, permitting the tool to be customized.

== Leadsheet Notation ==
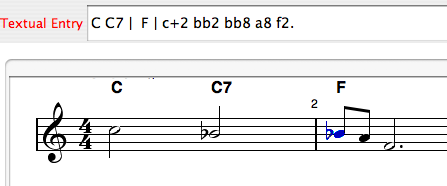
Rendering Leadsheet Notation

Impro-Visor saves lead sheets in a textual notation, and lead sheets may be created from that notation as well as by point-and-click. The notation was designed to be friendly to the jazz musician, by resembling directly what appears on the lead sheet staff. For example, the lead sheet fragment to the right, similar to that in article lead sheet, can be created by the following text:

C C7 | F |
c+2 bb2 bb8 a8 f2.

The reading of this text is: Chords C and C7 equally spaced in the first bar, and F in the second bar. A melody of c (the + means an octave above middle C, the 2 means a half-note), bb2, meaning a B♭ half-note, bb8, meaning a B♭ eighth-note, f2., meaning an F dotted half-note. Other meta-data can be supplied, such as for style specification, but is not required.

== Tone Categorization ==
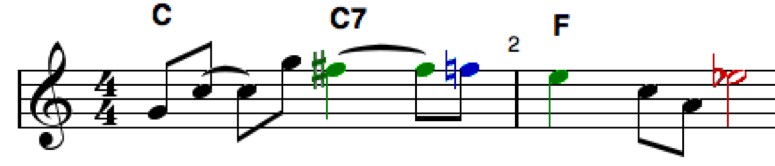
Using colors for tone categories

Impro-Visor categorizes tones that can be played over any chord into one of four categories. This serves two purposes: (i) as visual feedback to the user, where each category is rendered as a different color, and (ii) as a basis for lick generation. The categories are:

- Chord tones: tones that are in the chord, and which are thus the most consonant with it (shown as black on the right)
- Color tones: tones that are not in the chord, but which are also consonant with it (shown as green on the right)
- Approach tones: tones that are neither of the above, but which approach one of the above chromatically (shown as blue on the right)
- Other tones: none of the above (shown as red on the right)

The idea is that, aided by visual clues, the musician can learn to appreciate the degree to which a melody will be sonorous over a chord progression prior to hearing it.

== Grammatical Lick Generation ==
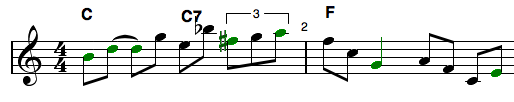
Lick generated using grammar to produce notes

Categories of notes discussed above are one of the key ingredients in automating the generation of melodies, which can be used by the musician in constructing solos. The other key ingredient is a context-free grammar having terminal symbols for each of the four categories, along with a few other terminal symbols for convenience. The grammar defines ways in which the melody space can be filled probabilistically by tones of various durations. By associating a probability with each grammar rule, the distribution of generated melodies can be controlled, for example to create melodies that are simple or complex, relatively consonant or dissonant, etc. The user indicates the chord progression, and the grammar drives the melody generation over that progression.

The figure at the right demonstrates an example generated lick. This particular grammar is constructed so as not to produce any discordant notes (notes in the "other" category above), thus no red notes appear in the figure.

== Grammar Learning ==
Version 4 added a feature for learning a grammar from a corpus of transcribed solos. The learned grammar loosely approximates the playing style of the soloist by creating abstract melodies from the solos, which can be re-instantiated into similar melodies through the grammar. Connections between learned abstract melodic fragments are represented as a Markov chain, which is encoded into the stochastic context-free grammar.

== Auto-Accompaniment ==
Impro-Visor automatically creates accompaniment, such as piano, bass, and drums, from the chord sequence on a leadsheet (a capability similar to, but currently not as full-featured as that of Band-in-a-Box). The style of accompaniment is derived from a set of pattern specifications using a textual notation similar to that for melodies. For example, a ride cymbal pattern common to swing jazz would be notated as

x4 x8 x8 x4 x8 x8

with x4 signifying a quarter-note hit and x8 an eighth-note hit. The swung note aspect, wherein eighth-notes on the beat get approximately twice the value of the beat, is rendered automatically by a numeric swing parameter, such as .67, which indicates that the beat is divided as .67 + .33 = 1. A similar pattern notation is used for chord comping and bassline patterns. In the latter type of pattern, a note category coding scheme similar to that for the grammatical notation is used to provide probabilistic creation of basslines.

== Roadmaps and Analysis of Chord Progressions ==
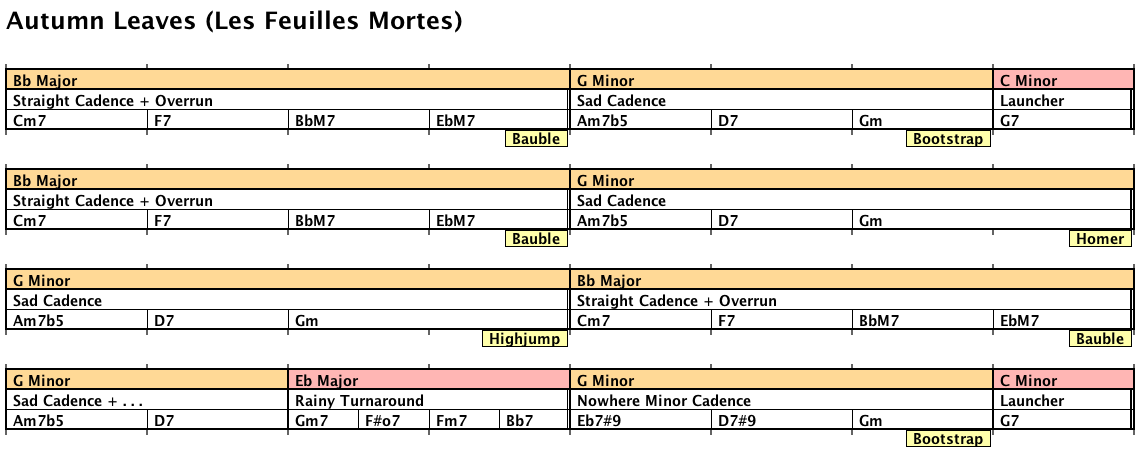
Roadmap produced by Impro-Visor

Impro-Visor analyzes jazz lead sheets to produce a roadmap of the tune. A roadmap is a sequence of bricks that represent harmonic idioms. The nomenclature for this approach is derived from that of Conrad Cork and John Elliott.

== See also ==
- Chord chart
- Chord progression
- Grammar induction
- Lead sheet
- Lick (music)
- Musical improvisation, discussion of improvisation in music
- Scorewriter, also contains the list of most Notation programs
- Stochastic context-free grammar, a type of grammar used by Impro-Visor to generate phrases
- List of music software
