= Streamripper =

Audio recording software

- Stable release: 1.64.6 / 31 March 2009; 17 years ago
- Written in: C
- Operating system: Cross-platform
- Type: Capture/Recording
- License: GNU GPL
- Website: streamripper.sf.net

Streamripper is a stand-alone client, or Winamp plugin, that records Internet radio streams in the MP3 or Vorbis formats, programmed by Jon Clegg and maintained by Gregory Sharp.

Streamripper was started in early 2000 as a way to separate tracks via SHOUTcast's title-streaming feature. This has now been expanded into a much more generic feature, where part of the program only tries to "hint" at where one track starts and another ends, thus allowing an MP3 decoding engine to scan for a silent mark, which is used to find an exact track separation.

Streamripper is now part of the FreeBSD standard distribution, mentioned in the Linux MP3 HOWTO, and can be compiled on many platforms, including Linux, Windows, FreeBSD, BeOS and OS/2. This is consistent with the fact that portability was a constant consideration during development.

Unlike Peer-to-peer file sharing networks which require the user to know in advance what they wish to download, Streamripper records entire batches of audio files in the sequence of play.

Streamripper can also host a local relay server on a user specified port so that a user can listen to the stream while the recording is in progress.
