= Hydrogen (software) =

Drum machine software

- Hydrogen logo
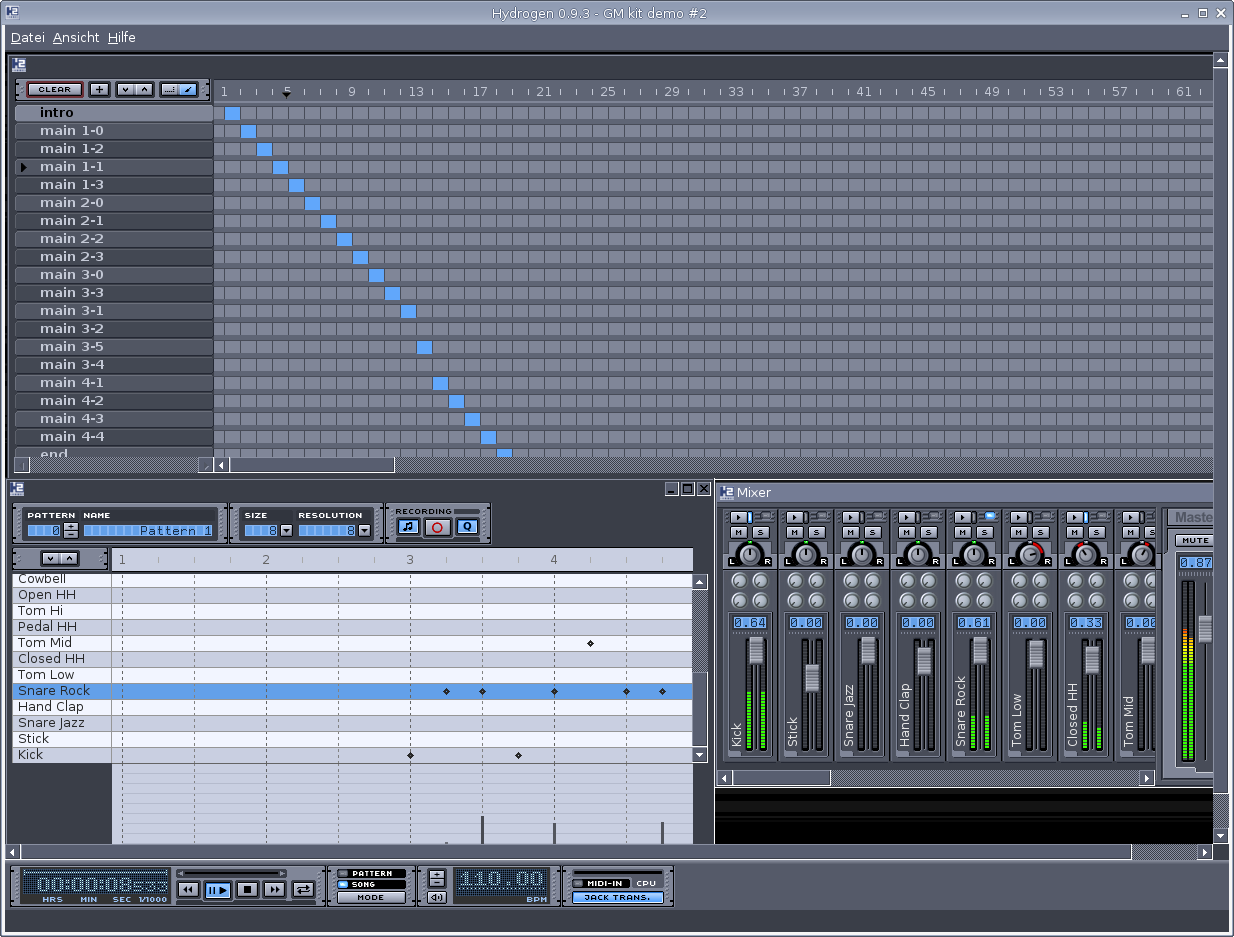
- Hydrogen screenshot
- Developer: Alessandro Cominu
- Stable release: 1.2.6 / July 29, 2025; 14 months ago
- Written in: C++, Qt
- Operating system: Linux, macOS, Microsoft Windows
- Type: Drum machine
- License: GPL-2.0-or-later
- Website: www.hydrogen-music.org
- Repository: github.com/hydrogen-music/hydrogen

Hydrogen is an open-source drum machine created by Alessandro Cominu, an Italian programmer who goes by the pseudonym Comix. Its main goal is to provide professional yet simple and intuitive pattern-based drum programming.

Hydrogen was originally developed for Linux, and later ported to Mac OS X and Windows. The graphical user interface for the application uses Qt library, and all code is released under GPL-2.0-or-later.

== Features ==
These are some of the features of Hydrogen:

- Pattern-based sequencer, with unlimited number of patterns and ability to chain patterns into a song.
- 192 ticks per whole note with individual level per event and variable pattern length.
- Unlimited instrument tracks with volume, mute, solo, pan capabilities.
- Multi-layer support for instruments (up to 16 samples for each instrument).
- Sample editor with basic cut and loop functions.
- Time-stretch and pitch functions.
- Time-line with variable tempo.
- Single and stacked pattern mode.
- Ability to import/export song files.
- Support for LADSPA effects.
- Real-time slide control for swing.
- Option to slightly randomize velocity, time, pitch and swing functions to give a more "human" playback.
- Multiple patterns playing at once.
- Various drumkits available to download (Rock, Jazz, Electric, Percussions...), plus support to create a custom drumkit.

== See also ==
- Free audio software
- Linux audio software
