= AV Linux =

Linux distribution focused on multimedia content creation

AV Linux MX Edition
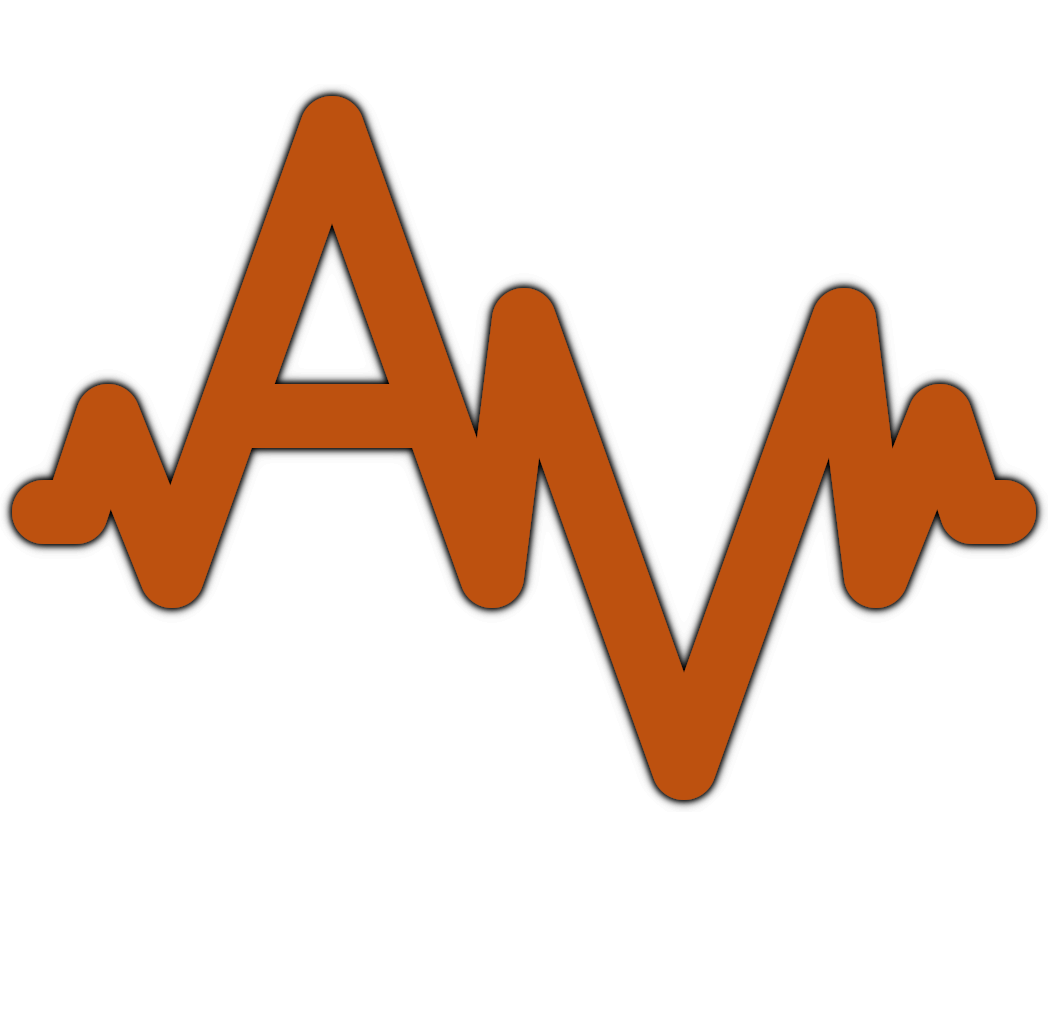
- Developer: Glen MacArthur
- OS family: Linux (Unix-like)
- Working state: Current
- Source model: Open source
- Latest release: AV Linux MX-25.3 / November 16, 2026; 1 day ago
- Marketing target: Multimedia content creation
- Update method: Advanced Packaging Tool
- Package manager: APT
- Supported platforms: x86-64
- Kernel type: Monolithic (Linux), patched for real-time use
- Official website: www.bandshed.net/avlinux/

AV Linux is a Linux distribution focused on multimedia content creation.

== Releases ==
Originally made with remastersys, new releases going forward are built on Debian-based distribution MX Linux.

- AV Linux 23.1 “Enlightened” version - the Window Manager is now Enlightenment. Previous versions used the Xfce and LXDE.
- AV Linux MX Edition 23.2 ISO update - bug fixes and improvements for new Users.
- AV Linux 25.2 - many notable changes and improvements; see reference for full change listing.
- MX Moksha 25.2 - Liquorix 7 Kernel, optional MXM Build using XLibre, Much faster booting with slightly larger ISO size; see reference for full change listing.

=== Currently supported releases ===
- AV Linux MX Edition (AVL-MXe) 23.2 - ISO update that addresses a few bugs in the first release of AVL-MXe 23.1
- AV Linux Base 23.5 - "Greatest Hits" released as a 'stripped down' (smaller download) and more of a daily driver distribution. A version with new ideas and no commercial or demo software included.
- AV Linux MX Edition 25 - a 64-bit only release with some new Moksha modules and new EFL applications that have been ported over to Enlightenment. The supplemental AV Linux Packages are now in a separate 'BSRPKG' package. AV Linux 25 provides a full environment for content creation, built around the Enlightenment 0.27.1 desktop environment.
- MX 25 Moksha edition introduces the Moksha 0.4.1 desktop from the Bodhi Linux project.
- AV Linux 25.3 and MX Moksha 25.3 - XFCE4 is fully integrated as an optional Desktop Environment. An AVL & MXM repository providing inhouse packaging of EFL 1.29.0, Enlightenment 0.28.0 Desktop Environment.

== Reception ==
Debugpoint.com: "AV Linux 23.1 “Enlightened” truly offers a robust, stable, and versatile platform for audio and video production. With its strategic integration of MX Linux elements, a performance-driven kernel, and a massive collection of multimedia tools, AV Linux remains a top choice"

Linuxiac: "AV Linux 23.1 'Enlightened' is a significant update, including MX-23/Debian 12 base, Enlightenment 0.25.4, and PipeWire 1.0.0."

ZDNet: "For anyone who's looking to switch platforms and audio creation, such as music, podcasts, or even streaming games, is your primary goal, you could do a lot worse than use AV Linux MXe."

== Historical releases ==
Versions 6 and earlier were 32-bit only, running a 32-bit Linux kernel.

- AV Linux 5.0 - was released on June 13, 2011.
- AV Linux 5.0.2 - was released on November 1, 2011.
- AV Linux 5.0.3 - was released on February 10, 2012.
- AV Linux 6.0 - was released on August 17, 2012.
- AV Linux 6.0.1 - was released on June 5, 2015.
- AV Linux 6.0.2 - was released on January 2, 2014.
- AV Linux 6.0.3 - was released on February 25, 2014.
- AV Linux 6.0.4 - was released on November 6, 2014.
- AV Linux 2016.8.30 - was released on September 7, 2016.
- AV Linux 2018.4.12 - was released on April 22, 2018.
- AV Linux 2018.6.25 - was released on June 25, 2018.
- AV Linux MX Edition 19.4.10 - 32-bit & 64-bit XFCE4 on Openbox, both based on MX Linux 19.3. The last release of the 32-bit version.
- AV Linux 2020.4.10 - was released on April 3, 2020.
- AV Linux 2020.11.23 - was released on November 25, 2020.
- AV Linux 2021.5.22 - was released on May 23, 2021.
- AV Linux MX-21 "Consciousness" - released on February 14, 2022 based on MX-21 Wildflower. A totally new build vs the past respins.
- AV Linux MX-21.2.1 - was released on December 16, 2022.

== See also ==
- MX Linux
- Debian
