= WaveSurfer =

Audio editing software

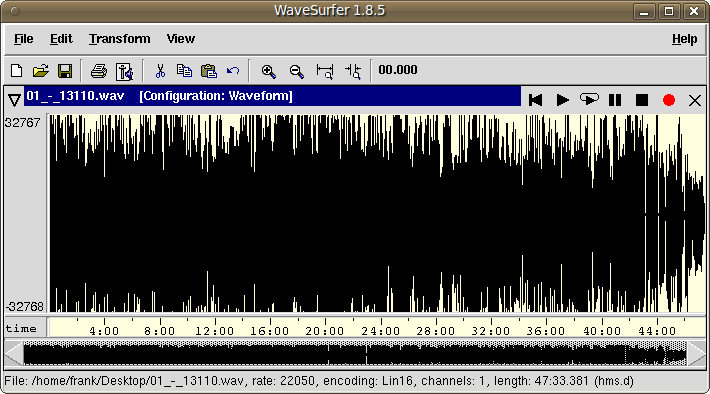
- Stable release: 1.8.8p6 / October 15, 2019; 6 years ago
- Operating system: Cross-platform
- Size: 4.0 MB
- Type: Digital audio editor
- License: BSD-like
- Website: www.speech.kth.se/wavesurfer/ archived
- Repository: https://sourceforge.net/projects/wavesurfer/

WaveSurfer is an audio editor widely used for studies of acoustic phonetics. It is a simple but fairly powerful program for interactive display of sound pressure waveforms, spectral sections, spectrograms, pitch tracks and transcriptions.It has also been used as the base for automated measurements. It can read and write a number of transcription file formats used in industrial speech research including TIMIT.

WaveSurfer is free software, distributed under a permissive free software licence

== Features ==
Wavesurfer provides basic audio editing operations, such as excision, copying, pasting, zero-crossing adjustment, and effects such as fading, normalization, echo, inversion, reversal, replacement with silence, and DC-removal, but, in view of its scientific orientation, does not offer effects of interest to musicians such as flange.

== Development ==
Wavesurfer is written in Tcl/Tk using the Snack audio library. It therefore runs on most platforms, including Microsoft Windows, Mac OS X, Linux, Solaris, HP-UX, FreeBSD, and IRIX. It is scriptable and supports plugins.

== See also ==
- List of music software
