= MilkyTracker =

Free software music tracker

- Screenshot of MilkyTracker
- Release: 2005
- Stable release: 1.05 / November 25, 2024; 21 months ago
- Preview release: 1.05.01 / November 28, 2024; 21 months ago
- Written in: C++
- Operating system: Windows, macOS, Linux, Android, FreeBSD, OpenBSD, MorphOS, AmigaOS, PocketPC, SerenityOS and HaikuOS
- Type: Music tracker
- License: GPL-3.0-or-later; MilkyPlay: BSD-3-Clause
- Website: milkytracker.org
- Repository: github.com/milkytracker/MilkyTracker

MilkyTracker is a free and open-source multi-platform music tracker for composing music in the MOD and XM module file formats. It is a clone of the popular MS-DOS program FastTracker 2, with special playback modes available for improved Amiga Protracker 2/3 compatibility.

== Module tracking ==
Module composition or "tracking" is done through the control of multichannel sample playback. An instrument is created by arranging one or more audio samples across a keyboard range. The instrument is then sequenced on a monophonic track that contains note, volume and effect data. A pattern is a series of tracks that are played back simultaneously. A song is then created by arranging the patterns.

== Features ==
MilkyTracker is able to open several legacy music module formats and is able to save in the .xm and .mod module formats and the .wav audio format.

Like FastTracker, MilkyTracker contains a sample editor and an instrument editor. The envelope editor of the instrument editor allows the creation of many envelope points and user definable envelope loop points.

MilkyTracker also supports basic (velocity sensitive) note input via MIDI.

== Platform support ==
MilkyTracker supports several operating systems and hardware platforms. These include:

- Microsoft Windows: MilkyTracker runs on Windows 9x, Me, NT, Windows 200x, XP, Vista, 7, 8, 8.1, 10, and 11
- Unix-like: MilkyTracker is available for Linux, Android, macOS, OpenBSD, FreeBSD and SerenityOS.
- Amiga: A port of MilkyTracker exists for AmigaOS, MorphOS and AROS.
- Windows Mobile: MilkyTracker can be run on Windows Mobile smartphones, PDAs, Pocket PC and a VDO Dayton car navigation system running Windows CE 4.2.
- Android
- HaikuOS
- Xbox
- GP2x
- Nintendo Wii U
- Nintendo Switch
- PlayStation 2
- PlayStation Portable
- PlayStation Vita

== History ==
MilkyTracker is not based on any existing module replay engine. Its core, MilkyPlay, has been in development since the mid-90s, originally as a Digitrakker .MDL player. MilkyTracker development started a decade later for the Pocket PC and it still fully operates on rather humble PDAs. MilkyTracker is a 2nd generation tracker and there are no plans to add modern tracker features that would break compatibility with FastTracker.

== See also ==
- Category:Audio trackers
