= Comparison of audio player software =

The following comparison of audio players compares general and technical information for a number of software media player programs. For the purpose of this comparison, "audio players" are defined as any media player explicitly designed to play audio files, with limited or no support for video playback. Multi-media players designed for video playback, which can also play music, are included under comparison of video player software.

== General ==
Name	Author	First public release	Latest stable version	Cost	Software license	Framework used	Written in
AIMP	AIMP DevTeam	August 8, 2006	Windows: 5.40, build 2716 (April 21, 2026; 5 months ago) [±] Android: 4.30, build 1725 (May 5, 2026; 5 months ago) [±]	No cost	Proprietary	BASS audio library (decoder)	Delphi
Amarok	Mark Kretschmann	June 1, 2003	3.3 (July 8, 2025; 15 months ago) [±]	No cost	GPL-2.0-or-later	via Phonon: GStreamer, xine, MPlayer, VLC, DirectShow, QuickTime	C++
aTunes	Alex Aranda et al.	January 1, 2006	3.1.2 (June 22, 2014; 12 years ago) [±]	No cost	GPL-2.0-or-later		Java
Audacious	Audacious Development Team	October 30, 2005	4.51 (September 7, 2025; 13 months ago) [±]	No cost	BSD-2-Clause	XMMS based	C, C++ (GTK & Qt)
Banshee	Aaron Bockover	February 17, 2005	2.6.2 (February 18, 2014; 12 years ago) [±]	No cost	MIT	GStreamer	C#
BTR Amp	BTR Labs	February 13, 2020	15.1 (March 21, 2023)	$0.99/month, $9.99/year, $29.99 one-time	Proprietary		
BZR Player	aargirakis	April 12, 2008	2.0.82 (Aug 6, 2025)	No cost	GPL-3.0-or-later		C++ (Qt)
Clementine	Clementine Team	February 22, 2010	1.3.1 (April 19, 2016; 10 years ago) [±]	No cost	GPL-3.0-or-later	GStreamer	C++ (Qt)
cmus	Timo Hirvonen	January 18, 2005	2.12.0 (October 26, 2024; 23 months ago) [±]	No cost	GPL-2.0-or-later		C
Cog	Vincent Spader	May 1, 2006	0.07 (December 24, 2007; 18 years ago) [±]	No cost	GPL-2.0-only		Objective-C
DeaDBeeF	Oleksiy Yakovenko	August 2009	1.9.6 / November 7, 2023	No cost	GPLv2, zlib		C, C++, Objective-C, Assembly language
Exaile	Adam Olsen	May 24, 2006		No cost	GPL-2.0-or-later	GStreamer	Python (GTK)
Ecoute	Louka Desroziers & Julien Sagot	September 2008	3.0.8	No cost (until version 4)	Proprietary	AV Foundation & QuickTime	Objective-C
Flash MP3 Player	Reality Software	March 11, 2008	1.00	No cost	Proprietary		
foobar2000	Peter Pawlowski	November 29, 2002	2.26 (1 October 2026) [±]	No cost	Proprietary (core), BSD (SDK)		C++
Guayadeque Music Player	Juan Rios, Tiago T Barrionuevo	March 12, 2009	0.7.5 (January 1, 2026)	No cost	GPL-3.0-or-later	GStreamer	C++ (wxWidgets)
iTunes	Apple Inc.	January 9, 2001		No cost	Proprietary	QuickTime	?
JRiver Media Center	JRiver, Inc.	February 1, 1999	34.0.24 (Windows) (May 6, 2025; 17 months ago) [±]	$59.98 to $79.98	Proprietary	JRiver code	C++
JuK	Scott Wheeler	February 1, 2003		No cost	GPL-2.0-or-later		C++
MediaMonkey Standard	Ventis Media Inc.	August 25, 2003	5.0.4.2690 (November 23, 2022; 3 years ago) [±]	No cost	Proprietary		Delphi, C
MediaMonkey Gold	Ventis Media Inc.	August 25, 2003	5.0.4.2690 (November 23, 2022; 3 years ago) [±]	$24.95USD	Proprietary		Delphi, C
MediaMonkey Lifetime	Ventis Media Inc.	August 25, 2003	5.0.4.2690 (November 23, 2022; 3 years ago) [±]	$49.95USD	Proprietary		
Groove Music	Microsoft	2012		No cost	Proprietary		
Mpxplay	Mpxplay	January 1, 1998	3.26 (31 July 2026) [±]	No cost	Proprietary		C
Music on Console	Damian Pietras	January 1, 2002	2.5.1 (April 24, 2016; 10 years ago) [±]	No cost	GPL-2.0-or-later		C
Music Player Daemon	Warren Dukes	May 1, 2003	0.21.22 (April 2, 2020; 6 years ago) [±]	No cost	GPL-2.0-or-later		C
MusicBee	Steven Mayall	December 4, 2008	3.6.9202 (March 17, 2025; 18 months ago) [±]	No cost	Proprietary	BASS audio library	Visual Basic .NET
musikCube	Casey Langen	January 1, 2005	3.0.5 (21 September 2025) [±]	No cost	BSD-3-Clause		
Napster	William Christopher Gorog	October 1, 2003	4.6.3.4 (August 31, 2010; 16 years ago) [±]	Subscription	Proprietary		
Quod Libet	Quod Libet Team	November 8, 2004	4.5.0 wikidata:Q1621193 (March 2022; 4 years ago) [±]	No cost	GPL-2.0-or-later	GStreamer	Python (GTK) PyGTK
Rdio	Rdio Inc	August 3, 2010	Microsoft Windows: 1.12.0.0 (2013) WP 8+ : 4.0.5.0 (28 October 2013; 12 years ago) iOS: 3.0.3 (27 September 2014; 12 years ago)	Subscription	Proprietary		
Rhapsody	RealNetworks	January 1, 2003	14.0 (16 October 2006) [±]	Subscription	Proprietary		
Rhythmbox	Colin Walters	April 1, 2004	3.4.8 (November 10, 2024; 22 months ago) [±]	No cost	GPL-2.0-or-later	GStreamer	C
Sayonara Player	Michael Lugmair (until 2020 under the pseudonym Lucio Carreras)	2011	1.5.1-stable5 / 29 August 2019	No cost	GPL-3.0-or-later	GStreamer	C++
Songbird	POTI Inc.	February 8, 2006	2.2.0, Build 2453 (February 4, 2013; 13 years ago) [±]	No cost	GPL	GStreamer	
Sonic Visualiser	Centre for Digital Music at Queen Mary, University of London	May 10, 2007	3.1.1 (August 14, 2018)	No cost	GPL-2.0-or-later		
Sonique	Media Science	November 1, 1998	1.96 (March 2002)	No cost	Proprietary		
Spotify	Spotify LTD	October 7, 2008	Windows: 1.3.4.258 / October 8, 2026; 1 day ago; macOS: 1.3.3.253 / October 1, 2026; 8 days ago; Linux: 1.3.3.253 / October 1, 2026; 8 days ago; Android: 9.1.72.1891 / July 31, 2026; 2 months ago; iOS (Note: Including iPadOS, watchOS and tvOS): 9.1.90 / October 8, 2026; 1 day ago; Wear OS: 9.1.48.1656 / May 14, 2026; 4 months ago	Subscription	Proprietary		
Style Jukebox	Digital Geek LTD	July 1, 2009	2.2.1 (October 8, 2016; 10 years ago) [±]	No cost	Proprietary		C#
Video.js (used on Wikipedia as of 2024)	Brightcove, Inc.	2010		No cost	Apache		JavaScript, HTML5
VLC Player		1996	Windows, Linux, & macOS: 3.0.24 / 22 September 2026; 17 days ago; Android: 3.7.0 / 8 January 2026; 9 months ago; ChromeOS: 1.7.3 / 23 December 2015; 10 years ago; iOS, Apple TV: 3.7.2 / 30 March 2026; 6 months ago; Windows (UWP): 3.1.2 / 20 July 2018; 8 years ago; Windows Phone: 3.1.2 / 20 July 2018; 8 years ago	No cost	GPL-2.0-or-later		C, C++, (with Qt), ...
Wax	Jeffrey Barish	July 19, 2024	1.0.4 (build 366)	No cost	MIT	GStreamer	Python (GTK 3.0)
Winamp	Nullsoft	April 21, 1997	5.9.2 Build 10042 (April 26, 2023; 3 years ago) [±]	No cost	Proprietary	Wasabi	C/C++
XMMS	XMMS Team	November 1, 1997	1.2.11 (November 16, 2007; 18 years ago) [±]	No cost	GPL-2.0-or-later	original	C
XMPlay	Un4seen Developments	1998	4.1 (December 23, 2025)	No cost	Proprietary	BASS audio library	
Name	Author	First public release	Stable version	Cost	Software license	Framework used	Written in

== Operating system compatibility ==
This section lists the operating systems on which the player works. There may be multiple versions of a player for different operating systems.

Audio player	Windows	macOS	Linux	iOS	Android	BSD Unix	Solaris	Other Unix	DOS
AIMP	Yes	No	via Wine	No	Yes	via Wine	No	No	No
Amarok	Yes	beta	Yes	No	No	Yes	Yes	Yes	No
aTunes	Yes	Yes	Yes	No	No	Yes	Yes	No	No
Audacious	Yes	No	Yes	No	No	Yes	Yes	Yes	No
Audion	No	Yes	No	No	No	No	No	No	No
Banshee	alpha	beta	Yes	No	No	Yes	No	No	No
BTR Amp	No	No	No	Yes	No	No	No	No	No
cmus	No	Yes	Yes	No	No	Yes	Yes	Yes	No
Cog	No	Yes	No	No	No	No	No	No	No
Clementine	Yes	Yes	Yes	No	remote controller only	Yes	Yes	Yes	No
DeaDBeeF	Yes	Yes	Yes	No	No	No	No	No	No
Ecoute	No	Yes	No	Yes	No	No	No	No	No
Exaile	Yes	No	Yes	No	No	Yes	No	No	No
foobar2000	Yes	beta	via Wine	Yes	Yes	via Wine	No	No	No
Guayadeque Music Player	No	Yes	Yes	No	No	No	No	No	No
Groove Music	Yes	No	No	No	No	No	No	No	No
iTunes	Yes	Yes	No	Yes	No	No	No	No	No
JRiver Media Center	Yes	Yes	Yes	remote controller only	Yes	No	No	No	No
MediaMonkey	Yes	No	No	No	Yes	No	No	No	No
MPXPLAY	Yes	No	No	No	No	No	No	No	Yes
Music Player Daemon	cygwin	Yes	Yes	No	No	Yes	Yes	Yes	No
MusicBee	Yes	No	Partial	No	No	No	No	No	No
Musicmatch Jukebox	Yes	Yes	No	No	No	No	No	No	No
musikCube	Yes	Yes	Yes	No	remote control only	Yes	No	No	No
Quod Libet	Yes	Yes	Yes	No	No	Yes	Yes	Yes	No
Rdio	Yes	Yes	No	Yes	Yes	No	No	No	No
Rhapsody	Yes	No	Yes	Yes	Yes	No	No	No	No
Rhythmbox	No	No	Yes	No	No	Yes	Yes	Yes	No
Sayonara Player	No	No	Yes	No	No	Yes	No	No	No
Songbird	Yes	Yes	No	No	Yes	No	No	No	No
Sonique	Yes	No	No	No	No	No	No	No	No
Spotify	Yes	Yes	Yes	Yes	Yes	No	No	No	No
Style Jukebox	Yes	No	No	Yes	Yes	No	No	No	No
Wax	No	No	Yes	No	No	No	No	No	No
Winamp	Yes	Yes	No	Yes	Yes	No	No	No	No
XMMS	No	Yes	Yes	No	No	Yes	Yes	Yes	No
XMPlay	Yes	No	No	No	No	No	No	No	No
Zinf	Yes	No	Yes	No	No	Yes	Yes	Yes	No
Audio player	Windows	macOS	Linux	iOS	Android	BSD Unix	Solaris	Other Unix	DOS

== Features ==
Audio player	Video playback	Outbound streaming	Skinnable	Media database	Gapless audio decoding	Visualizer	Remote controllable	Intelligent playlists from database (based on criteria)
AIMP	No	via Plugins	Yes	Yes	Yes	Yes	via Plugins	No
Amarok	Partial (Note: Basic function with NMM)	Yes	Partial (Note: Context Browser uses CSS.)	Yes	Yes	Yes	Yes	Yes
Audacious	No	No	Yes	No	Yes	Yes	Yes	No
Audion	No	No	Yes	No	?	Yes	?	No
BTR Amp	No	No	No	Yes	Yes	No	No	Yes
cmus	No	No	Yes	Yes	Yes	No	Yes	No
Cog	No	No	No	No	Yes	No	Yes	No
Clementine	No	No	No	Yes	Yes	Yes	Yes	Yes
Exaile	No	?	No	Yes	Yes	No	Yes	Yes
foobar2000	No	Partial (Note: Plugin available.)	Yes (Note: UIs may be switched. Shares Windows' themes by default. Additionally, a plugin (foo_looks) can skin foobar2000.)	Yes	Yes	Yes	Partial	Yes
iTunes	Yes	Yes	Partial	Yes	Yes	Yes	Yes	Yes
JRiver Media Center	Yes	Yes	Yes	Yes	Yes	Yes	via Plugins	Yes
JuK	No	No	No	Yes	No	No	Yes (Note: Using DCOP)	?
MediaMonkey	Yes	Partial	Yes	Yes	Yes	Yes	Partial	Yes
MPXPLAY	Yes (with MMC v2.00a)	?	text-interface	Yes	Yes	Yes	Yes (also LCD ability)	?
Music Player Daemon	No	Yes	Client dependent	Yes	Yes	Client dependent	Yes	Client dependent
MusicBee	No	No	Yes	Yes	Yes	Yes	Yes	Yes
Musicmatch Jukebox	No	No	Yes	Yes	?	Yes	Yes	?
musikCube	No	No	No	Yes	No	Partial	?	Yes
Quod Libet	No	No	No	Yes	Yes	No	Yes	Yes
Rhapsody	No	No	No	Yes	?	No	?	?
Rhythmbox	No	No	No	Yes	Yes	Yes	Yes	Yes
Sayonara Player	No	?	No (Dark Mode available)	Yes	Yes	Yes	No	Yes
Sonique	Partial	No	Yes	No	No	Yes	?	No
Spotify	Yes	?	No	No	Yes	No	Yes (via app)	No
Wax	No	No	No	Yes	Yes	No	No	No
Winamp	Yes	Yes	Yes	Yes	Yes	Yes	Yes	Yes
XMMS	Partial	Partial	Yes	No	Partial	Yes	Yes	No
XMPlay	Partial	Partial	Yes	No	Yes	Yes	No	No
Zinf	No	No	Yes	Yes	?	No	?	?
Audio player	Video playback	Outbound streaming	Skinnable	Media database	Gapless audio decoding	Visualizer	Remote controllable	Intelligent playlists from database (based on criteria)

Audio player	ReplayGain	Tag mass	Tag flexible (Note: Flexible tagging is the ability to read or write custom tags, apart from the default ones like title, album and date. Users can use custom tags to provide additional information to media files. Custom tags work via ID3v2.4 (via the TXXX tag field), Vorbis comments and APEv2.)	Time stretch	Pitch shift	A-B repeat	Bookmark	Auto resume	Shutdown on play complete	Archive ability
AIMP	Yes	Yes (Note: Through use of the Advanced Tag Editor.)	Yes	Yes	Yes	Yes	Yes	Yes	Yes	No
Amarok	Yes	Yes	Yes	No	No	Yes	Yes	Yes	No	No
Audacious	Yes	No	No	Yes	Yes	Yes	No	Yes	No	No
Audion	?	?	?	?	?	?	?	?	?	?
BTR Amp	Yes	?	Yes	?	No	?	No	Yes	No	
cmus	Yes	No	No	No	No	No	No	Yes	No	No
Cog	?	?	?	?	?	?	?	?	?	?
Clementine	Yes	Yes	No	No	No	?	No	No	No	No
Exaile	Yes	Yes	Yes	No	No	Yes	Yes	Yes	Yes	No
foobar2000	Yes	Yes	Yes	Yes	Yes	Yes	Partial	Yes	Partial	Yes
iTunes	Yes	Yes	No	No	No	No	Yes	Yes	No	No
JRiver Media Center	Yes	Yes	Yes	Yes	Yes	Yes	Yes	Yes	Yes	No
JuK	?	?	?	?	?	?	?	?	?	?
MediaMonkey	Yes	Yes	Yes	Partial	Partial	Partial	Partial	Yes	Yes	?
MPXPLAY	?	?	?	?	?	?	?	?	?	?
MusicBee	Yes	Yes	Yes	Yes	Yes	No	Yes	Yes	Yes	Yes
Musicmatch Jukebox	?	Partial (Note: Paid version only)	?	No	No	?	?	?	?	?
musikCube	?	?	?	?	?	?	?	?	?	?
Quod Libet	Yes	Yes	Yes	Partial (Note: Through Audio Pitch, Speed plugin)	Partial	No	Yes	Yes	No	No
Rhapsody	?	?	?	?	?	?	?	?	?	?
Rhythmbox	Yes	Yes	No	No	No	No	No	Yes	No	No
Sayonara Player	Yes	Yes	No	No	No	?	Yes	Yes	?	?
Sonique	No	No	?	Yes	Yes	No	No	No	No	?
Spotify	No	No	No	No	No	No	No	Yes	No	No
Wax	No	No	Yes	No	No	No	No	No	No	No
Winamp	Yes	Yes	?	No	Yes	?	Yes	?	No	?
XMMS	Partial	Yes	?	No	No	No	No	Yes	No	No
XMPlay	Yes	No	No	No	No	No	Yes	Yes	No	Yes
Zinf	?	?	?	?	?	?	?	?	No	?
Audio player	ReplayGain	Tag mass	Tag flexible	Time stretch	Pitch shift	A-B repeat	Bookmark	Auto resume	Shutdown on play complete	Archive ability

== Audio format ability ==
Information about what audio formats the players understand. Footnotes lead to information about abilities of future versions of the players or plugins/filters that provide such functionality.

Audio player	Lossy compression									Lossless compression					
Audio player	MP3	WMA	RealAudio	Vorbis	Musepack	AAC	Dolby AC-3	VQF	Opus	APE	FLAC	ALAC	SHN	WV	WMA L
AIMP	Yes	Yes	No	Yes	Yes	Yes	Yes	Yes (Note: Available through a Winamp plugin.)	Yes	Yes	Yes	Yes	No	Yes	Yes
Amarok (Note: Amarok uses non-Amarok libraries to decode audio. It will play any file for which a codec is available on the system. The default libraries in Linux are from the GStreamer project, and in Windows from the VLC project.)	Yes	Yes	Yes	Yes	Yes	Yes	Yes	Yes	Yes	No	Yes	Yes	Yes	Yes	Yes
Audacious	Yes	Yes	No	Yes	Yes	Yes	Yes	?	Yes (Note: Available through a FFmpeg plugin.)	Yes	Yes	Yes	No	Yes	?
Audion	Yes	No	No	Yes	No	No	No	?	?	No	No	No	No	No	?
Banshee	Yes	?	?	Yes	?	?	?	?	?	No	?	?	?	?	?
BTR Amp	Yes	No	No	Yes	Yes	Yes	No	No	Yes	Yes	Yes	Yes	No	Yes	No
cmus	Yes	Yes	No	Yes	Yes	Yes	Yes	?	Yes (Note: Available through the opusfile plugin.)	Yes	Yes	Yes	Yes	Yes	?
Cog	Yes	No	No	Yes	Yes	Yes	No	?	?	Yes	Yes	Yes	Yes	Yes	?
Exaile	Yes (Note: Available through a Gstreamer plugin.)	Yes	Yes	Yes	Yes	Yes	Yes	?	Yes	Yes	Yes	Yes	Yes	Yes	?
foobar2000	Yes	Yes	No	Yes	Yes	Yes	Partial	No	Yes	Yes	Yes	Yes	Yes	Yes	Yes
Groove Music	Yes	Yes	No	No	?	Yes	Yes	?	?	?	Yes	?	?	?	?
JRiver Media Center	Yes	Yes	Yes	Yes	Yes	Yes	Yes	Yes	Yes	Yes	Yes	Yes	Yes	Yes	Yes
JuK	Yes	No	No	Yes	Yes	No	No	?	?	Yes	Yes	No	Yes	No	?
Media Jukebox	Yes (Note: Requires External Encoding App)	Yes	Yes	Yes	Yes	Yes	Yes	?	?	Yes	Yes	Yes	Yes	Yes	?
MediaMonkey	Yes	Yes	No	Yes	Yes	Partial (Note: Available via plugins that can be automatically downloaded during installation.)	Partial	?	No	Yes	Yes	Yes	Partial	Partial	?
MPXPLAY	Yes	Yes	No	Yes	Yes	Yes	Yes	?	Partial	Yes	Yes	No	No	Yes	?
Music Player Daemon	Yes	Yes	Partial	Yes	Yes	Yes	Yes	Yes	Yes	Yes	Yes	Yes	Yes	Yes	?
MusicBee	Yes	Yes	No	Yes	Yes	Yes	Yes	Yes	Yes	Yes	Yes	Yes	Yes	Yes	Yes
Musicmatch Jukebox	Yes	Yes	No	No	No	No	No	?	?	No	No	No	No	No	?
musikCube	Yes	Partial	No	Yes	Partial	Partial	Partial	?	?	Yes	Yes	No	No	Partial	?
Quod Libet	Yes	Yes	Yes	Yes	Yes	Yes	Yes	?	Yes	Yes	Yes	Yes	Yes	Yes	?
Rhapsody	Yes	Yes	Yes	No	No	Yes	No	?	?	No	No	No	No	No	?
Rhythmbox	Yes	Yes	Yes	Yes	Yes	Yes	Yes	?	Yes	Yes	Yes	Yes	Yes	Yes	?
Sayonara Player	Yes	?	?	Yes	?	?	No	?	Yes	?	Yes	?	?	?	?
Sonique	Yes	Yes	No	Yes	Partial	Partial	No	?	?	No	No	No	No	No	?
Spotify	Yes	No	No	No	No	Yes	No	No	No	No	Yes	No	No	No	No
Style Jukebox	Yes	Yes	No	No	No	Yes	No	No	No	No	Yes	Yes	No	No	Yes
Wax	Yes	Yes	Yes	Yes	Yes	Yes	Yes	?	Yes	Yes	Yes	Yes	Yes	Yes	?
Winamp	Yes	Yes	Yes	Yes	Yes	Yes	?	?	?	?	Yes	?	?	Yes	?
XMMS	Yes	Partial	Partial	Partial	Yes	Yes	No	Yes	?	Partial	Yes	No	Partial	Yes	?
XMPlay	Yes	Yes	Yes	Yes	Yes	Yes	Yes	?	Yes	Yes	Yes	Yes	Yes	Yes	?
Zinf	Yes	No	No	Yes	No	No	No	?	?	No	No	No	No	No	?
Audio player	MP3	WMA	RealAudio	Vorbis	Musepack	AAC	Dolby AC-3	VQF	Opus	APE	FLAC	ALAC	SHN	WV	WMA L

== Container format ability ==
Information about what container formats the players understand. Footnotes lead to information about abilities of future versions of the players or filters that provide such functionality.

Audio player	AVI	ASF	QuickTime	Ogg	OGM	Matroska	MP4	MPEG-21	NUT	FLV
AIMP	No	Yes	No	Yes	No	Yes	Partial	No	No	No
Amarok	Yes	Yes	Yes	Yes	Basic	Basic	Yes	?	?	Yes
Audacious	No	Yes	No	Yes	No	No	Yes	No	No	Audio only
Audion	No	No	No	No	No	No	No	?	?	?
cmus	No	No	No	Vorbis only	No	Basic	Yes	?	?	?
Cog	No	No	No	Yes	No	No	Partial	?	?	?
foobar2000	Partial	Yes	No	Yes	No	Yes	Yes	?	?	Audio only
JuK	No	No	No	Vorbis only	No	No	No	?	?	?
JRiver Media Center	Yes	Yes	Yes	Yes	Yes	Yes	Yes	Yes	?	Yes
MediaMonkey	No	No	No	Vorbis only	No	No	No	?	?	?
MOC	Yes	?	?	Yes	?	Yes	Yes	?	?	Yes
MPXPLAY	Yes	Yes	No	Yes	?	?	Yes	?	?	?
MusicBee	No	No	No	Vorbis only	No	No	AAC only	No	No	No
Musicmatch Jukebox	No	No	No	No	No	No	No	?	?	?
musikCube	No	No	No	Vorbis only	No	No	No	?	?	?
Rhapsody	No	No	No	No	No	No	No	?	?	?
Rhythmbox	No	Yes	No	Vorbis only	No	No	Yes	?	?	?
Sayonara Player	No	?	No	Vorbis only	?	?	?	?	?	?
Sonique	No	No	No	Yes	No	No	No	?	?	?
Winamp	Yes	Yes	Yes	Yes	Yes	Yes	Yes	?	?	Yes
XMMS	No	No	No	Vorbis only	No	No	No	?	?	?
Zinf	No	No	No	Vorbis only	No	No	No	?	?	?
Audio player	AVI	ASF	QuickTime	Ogg	OGM	Matroska	MP4	MPEG-21	NUT	FLV

== Scalable, composite and emulation format abilities ==
Audio player	Flash	RealPix	QuickTime Video Effects in mov	HTML+TIME (+VML)	smil/smi	SVG	MIDI (smf)	MIDI (kar)	MIDI (xmf)	MIDI (rmi)	MIDI (xmi)	NSF	SPC	PSF
AIMP	No	No	No	No	No	No	No	Yes	No	No	No	No	No	No
Amarok	?	?	?	?	?	?	?	?	?	?	?	?	?	?
Audacious	No	No	No	No	No	No	Yes	No	No	Yes	No	Yes	Yes	Yes
Audion	?	?	?	?	?	?	?	?	?	?	?	?	?	?
cmus	No	No	No	No	No	No	No	No	No	No	No	No	No	No
Cog	?	?	?	?	?	?	?	?	?	?	?	?	?	?
foobar2000	No	No	No	No	No	No	Yes (plugin)	?	?	Yes (plugin)	Yes (plugin)	Yes (plugin)	Yes (plugin)	Yes (plugin)
JuK	?	?	?	?	?	?	?	?	?	?	?	?	?	?
JRiver Media Center	?	?	?	?	?	?	?	?	?	?	?	?	?	?
MediaMonkey	?	?	?	?	?	?	?	?	?	?	?	Yes (Winamp plugin)	Yes (Winamp plugin)	Yes (Winamp plugin)
MPXPLAY	?	?	?	?	?	?	?	?	?	?	?	?	?	?
MusicBee	?	?	?	?	?	?	?	?	?	?	?	Yes	?	?
Musicmatch Jukebox	?	?	?	?	?	?	?	?	?	?	?	?	?	?
musikCube	?	?	?	?	?	?	?	?	?	?	?	?	?	?
Rhapsody	?	?	?	?	?	?	?	?	?	?	?	?	?	?
Rhythmbox	?	?	?	?	?	?	?	?	?	?	?	?	Yes	?
Sayonara Player	?	?	?	?	?	?	?	?	?	?	?	?	?	?
Sonique	?	?	?	?	?	?	?	?	?	?	?	?	?	?
XMMS	?	?	?	?	?	?	?	?	?	?	?	?	?	?
Zinf	?	?	?	?	?	?	?	?	?	?	?	?	?	?
Audio player	Flash	RealPix	QuickTime Video Effects in mov	HTML+TIME (+VML)	smil/smi	SVG	MIDI (smf)	MIDI (kar)	MIDI (xmf)	MIDI (rmi)	MIDI (xmi)	NSF	SPC	PSF

== Protocol abilities ==
Information about which internet protocols the players understand, for receiving streaming media content. Footnotes lead to information about abilities of future versions of the players or plugins that provide such functionality.

Audio player	HTTP	RTSP (RTSPU, RTSPT)	MMS (MMSU, MMST)	Podcasting	Other
AIMP	Yes	No	Yes	No	No
Amarok	Yes	Yes	Yes	Yes	UPNP
Audacious	Yes	No	Yes	No	?
Audion	Yes	No	No	No	?
cmus	Yes	No	No	No	?
Cog	No	No	No	No	?
foobar2000	Yes	Partial (Note: Only WMA files are playable by foobar2000 through an RTSP connection. RealMedia, AAC, etc. are not supported.)	Yes	Partial (Note: 3rd party plugin for 0.9 allows reading RSS 2.0 feeds as playlists. No subscription/automatic update features.)	?
JuK	?	?	?	?	?
JRiver Media Center	Yes	Yes	Yes	Yes	?
MediaMonkey	Yes	No	No	Yes (Note: Present in version 3.0 currently going through Alpha Testing.)	?
MusicBee	Yes	?	?	Yes	?
Musicmatch Jukebox	Yes	?	?	?	?
musikCube	Yes	No	No	?	?
Music Player Daemon	Yes (Note: Provided by the "curl" plugins.)	Yes (Note: Provided by the "ffmpeg" plugin.)	Yes (Note: Provided by the "mms" plugin.)	Yes	Music Player Daemon
Rhapsody	Yes	Yes	Yes	Yes	?
Rhythmbox	Yes	Yes	No	Partial (Note: As of 0.9.2 it allows reading RSS as podcast source. Issues if links in RSS do not point directly to playable media. Automatic update of podcasts available.)	UPNP
Sayonara Player	Yes	?	?	?	?
Sonique	Yes	?	?	?	?
XMMS	Yes	?	?	?	?
Zinf	Yes	Yes	No	No	?
Audio player	HTTP	RTSP (RTSPU, RTSPT)	MMS (MMSU, MMST)	Podcasting	Other

== Playlist format ability ==
Information about which playlist formats the players understand.

Audio player	asx, wax, wvx	M3U	pls	XSPF	CUE	SMIL
AIMP	Yes	Yes	Yes	Yes	Yes	?
Amarok	Yes	Yes	Yes	Yes	Yes	?
Audacious	Partial	Yes	Yes	Yes	Yes	Partial
Audion	No	No	No	?	?	No
Clementine	Yes	Yes	Yes	Yes	Yes	?
cmus	No	Yes	Yes	No	?	?
Cog	?	?	?	?	?	?
Exaile	Yes	Yes	Yes	Yes	?	?
foobar2000	Yes	Yes	Yes	Yes	Yes	?
iTunes	No	Yes	?	?	No	?
JRiver Media Center	Yes	Yes	Yes	Yes	Yes	?
JuK	?	?	?	?	?	?
MediaMonkey	?	Yes	?	No	?	?
MPXPLAY	?	Yes	Yes	?	Yes	?
MusicBee	Yes	Yes	Yes	Yes	Yes	?
Musicmatch Jukebox	?	Yes	?	?	?	?
musikCube	?	?	?	?	?	?
Quod Libet	Partial	Yes	Yes	No	?	?
Rhapsody	?	?	?	?	?	?
Rhythmbox	?	?	Yes	?	No	?
Sayonara Player	?	Yes	?	?	?	?
Sonique	?	Yes	Yes	?	?	?
Spotify	No	No	No	No	No	?
Winamp	Yes	Yes	Yes	Yes	?	?
XMMS	?	Yes	Yes	?	?	?
Zinf	?	?	?	No	?	?
Audio player	asx/wax/wvx	M3U	pls	XSPF	CUE	SMIL

== Metadata ability ==
Information about what metadata, or tagging, formats the players understand. Most other containers have their own metadata format and the players usually use them. Footnotes lead to information about abilities of future versions of the players or plugins that provide such functionality.

Audio player	ID3v1	ID3v2	APEv2 tag	Vorbis comment	Cue sheet	CD-Text	WAVE chunks
AIMP	Yes	Yes	Yes	Yes	Yes	Yes	Yes
Amarok	Yes (Note: Understanding of ID3v1, ID3v2, APEv2 and Vorbis comments is handled by an external library called TagLib.)	Yes (Note: Amarok does not understand embedded covers.)	Yes	Yes	Yes (Note: Yes, but buggy.)	?	Yes
Audacious	Yes	Yes	Yes	Yes	Yes	Yes	?
Audion	Yes	Yes	No	No	?	?	?
cmus	Yes	Yes	Yes	Yes	Yes	No	?
Cog	Yes	Yes	Yes	Yes	Yes	?	?
foobar2000	Yes	Yes	Yes	Yes	Yes	Yes (Note: There is a plugin called CD-TEXT Reader adding such a feature.)	Yes
iTunes	Yes	Yes	Yes	?	?	?	?
JRiver Media Center	Yes	Yes	Yes	Yes	Yes	Yes	Yes
JuK	Yes	Yes	Yes	Yes	?	?	?
MediaMonkey	Yes	Yes	Yes	Yes	?	Yes	?
Mixxx	Yes	Yes	Yes	Yes	No	No	Yes
MPXPLAY	Yes	Yes	Yes	Yes	?	?	?
MusicBee	Yes	Yes	Yes	Yes	Yes	Yes	Yes
Musicmatch Jukebox	Yes	Yes	No	?	?	Yes	?
musikCube	Yes	Yes	Yes	?	?	?	?
Quod Libet	Yes	Yes	Yes	Yes	No	No	Yes
Rhapsody	Yes	Yes	No	No	?	?	?
Rhythmbox	Yes	Yes	Yes	Yes	?	?	?
Sayonara Player	Yes	Yes	?	Yes	?	?	?
Sonique	Yes	No	?	?	?	?	?
XMMS	Yes	Yes	No	Yes	?	?	?
Zinf	Yes	Yes	No	Yes	?	?	?
Audio player	ID3v1	ID3v2	APEv2 tag	Vorbis comment	Cue sheet	CD-Text	WAVE chunks

== Optical media ability ==
Information about what kinds of optical discs the players can play. Footnotes lead to information about abilities of future versions of the players or plugins that provide such functionality. Playback of Super Audio CD is not possible for any media player, because no suitable hardware exists. All media players capable of audio CD playback will also play the Redbook core of any HDCD disc, providing no sound-quality benefits over standard audio CDs.

Audio player	Audio		
Audio player	CD	DVD-Audio	HDCD
AIMP	Yes	No	No
Amarok	Partial	No	No
aTunes	No	No	No
Audacious	Yes	No	No
Audion	Yes	No	No
cmus	No	No	No
Cog	No	No	No
foobar2000	Yes	Yes (plugin)	Yes (plugin)
JuK	Yes (Note: Requires K3B)	No	No
JRiver Media Center	Yes	Yes	Yes
MediaMonkey	Yes	No	No
MusicBee	Yes	Yes	Yes
Musicmatch Jukebox	Yes	No	No
musikCube	Yes	No	No
Rhapsody	Yes	No	No
Rhythmbox	Yes	No	No
Sonique	Yes	No	No
Winamp	Yes	No	No
XMMS	Yes	No	No
Zinf	Yes	No	No
Audio player	CD	DVD-Audio	HDCD
Audio player	Audio		

== See also ==
- List of codecs
- List of open-source codecs
- Comparison of video container formats
- List of podcast clients
