= FoxyTunes =

- Developers: Alex Sirota, Yahoo! Inc.
- Stable release: 4.3.6 / March 22, 2012
- Operating system: Cross-platform
- Platform: Mozilla Firefox/SeaMonkey/Thunderbird, and Internet Explorer
- Type: Web browser, Music, Media player
- License: Freeware, Proprietary

FoxyTunes was a browser extension allowing control of media players from the web browser window. The company that developed FoxyTunes was bought by Yahoo! in 2008, and FoxyTunes was closed in 2013.

== History ==
In 2004 computer science graduate student Alex Sirota was making Foxytunes available for free and accepting donations. The company behind Foxytunes was founded in 2005 by Vitaly and Alex Sirota with private investors and subsequently acquired by Yahoo! on February 4, 2008, for what was understood to be over US$30,000,000, Yahoo! retaining the Foxytunes branding. On June 28, 2013, Yahoo! announced FoxyTunes's closure, scheduled for July 1, 2013. At its peak FoxyTunes was available in over 30 languages.

== Software ==
Foxytunes was controlled by a toolbar interface which was installed on the web browser.

Supported web browsers and other applications included Mozilla Firefox, Internet Explorer, SeaMonkey, Mozilla Application Suite, Flock and Mozilla Thunderbird. The extension supported the normal media player functions and displayed currently playing track information. In 2007 the FoxyTunes Planet rich media front page was launched. Additionally, the extension allowed searching various Web sites to get images, lyrics, videos, biographies etc. related to the music being played.

The presentation of the toolbar interface could be altered by a skin extension. This allowed a user to select from alternative presentations of the toolbar which had alternative characteristics of colors, layout, size and collapsed state.

=== Supported players ===
FoxyTunes supported more than 30 desktop and web-based media players on a diverse variety of platforms.

Microsoft Windows

- Apollo media player
- The Core Media Player
- dBpoweramp Audio Player:
- foobar2000
- iTunes
- JetAudio
- JRiver Media Center
- Last.fm
- MediaMonkey
- Media Player Classic
- musikCube
- Musicmatch Jukebox
- Spotify
- Songbird
- Sonique
- Quintessential Player
- Pandora
- RealPlayer
- UltraPlayer
- VLC media player
- Winamp
- Windows Media Player
- Yahoo! Music Jukebox / Yahoo! Music Engine

Linux systems

- XMMS
- Beep Media Player
- Noatun
- JuK
- Amarok
- Music Player Daemon
- Rhythmbox

Mac OS X

- iTunes

Online services

- Yahoo! News
- Yahoo! Music
- Twitter with TwittyTunes

== Reception ==
FoxyTunes Version 1.0 was reviewed in 2004 by ExtremeTech, in 2005 by Ynet, by Tony Hoffman in "The Best Free Software (2007)" in PCMag and Preston Gralla in PCWorld. It was Claudine Beaumont's favourite in her 2008 article "Firefox 3: Top ten extensions" in The Telegraph. Haaretz reported in 2008 that it had been downloaded by 8 million users. It was reviewed in 2009 by download.com and Softpedia. In 2010 in How-To Geek. In 2011 by Chris Wiles at TechAdvisor/Macworld, and Ghacks.
