= ReplayGain =

Loudness normalization system

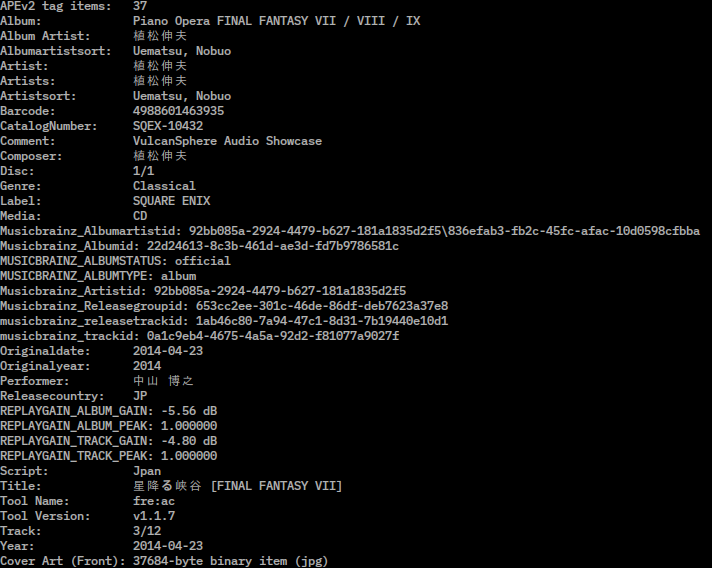
Example of APE tags with ReplayGain tags

ReplayGain is a proposed technical standard published by David Robinson in 2001 to measure and normalize the perceived loudness of audio in computer audio formats such as MP3 and Ogg Vorbis. It allows media players to normalize loudness for individual tracks or albums. This avoids the common problem of having to manually adjust volume levels between tracks when playing audio files from albums that have been mastered at different loudness levels.

Although this de facto standard is now formally known as ReplayGain, it was originally known as Replay Gain and is sometimes abbreviated RG.

ReplayGain is supported in a large number of media software and portable devices.

== Operation ==
ReplayGain works by first performing a psychoacoustic analysis of an entire audio track or album to measure peak level and perceived loudness. Equal-loudness contours are used to compensate for frequency effects and statistical analysis is used to accommodate for effects related to time. The difference between the measured perceived loudness and the desired target loudness is calculated; this is considered the ideal replay gain value. Typically, the replay gain and peak level values are then stored as metadata in the audio file. ReplayGain-capable audio players use the replay gain metadata to automatically attenuate or amplify the signal on a per-track or per-album basis such that tracks or albums play at a similar loudness level. The peak level metadata can be used to prevent gain adjustments from inducing clipping in the playback device.

=== Metadata ===
The original ReplayGain proposal specified an 8-byte field in the header of any file. Most implementations now use tags for ReplayGain information. FLAC and Ogg use the REPLAYGAIN_* Vorbis comment fields. Monkey's Audio and WavPack use APE tag while MP3 files usually use ID3v2. Other formats such as MP4 and WMA use their native tag formats with a specially formatted tag entry listing the track's replay gain and peak loudness.

ReplayGain utilities usually add metadata to the audio files without altering the original audio data. Alternatively, a tool can amplify or attenuate the data itself and save the result to another, gain-adjusted audio file; this is not perfectly reversible in most cases. Some lossy audio formats, such as MP3, are structured in a way that they encode the volume of each compressed frame in a stream, and tools such as MP3Gain take advantage of this for directly applying the gain adjustment to MP3 files, adding undo information so that the process is reversible.

=== Target loudness ===
The target loudness is specified as the loudness of a stereo pink noise signal played back at 89 dB sound pressure level or −14 dB relative to full scale. This is based on SMPTE recommendation RP 200:2002, which specifies a similar method for calibrating playback levels in movie theaters using a reference level 6 dB lower (83 dB SPL, −20 dBFS). (Note: Although the original ReplayGain proposal used the 83 dB SPL reference level unchanged, an early departure from the proposal to 89 dB SPL was endorsed by its author.)

=== Track-gain and album-gain ===
ReplayGain analysis can be performed on individual tracks so that all tracks will be of equal volume on playback. Analysis can also be performed on a per-album basis. In album-gain analysis, an additional peak-value and gain-value, which will be shared by the whole album, are calculated. Using the album-gain values during playback will preserve the volume differences among tracks on an album.

On playback, listeners may decide if they want all tracks to sound equally loud or if they want all albums to sound equally loud with different tracks having different loudness. In album-gain mode, when album-gain data is missing, players should use track-gain data instead.

== Alternatives ==
- Peak amplitude is not a reliable indicator of loudness, so consequently peak normalization does not offer reliable normalization of perceived loudness. RMS normalization is more accurate but does not take into account psychoacoustic aspects of loudness perception.
- With dynamic range compression, volume may be altered on the fly on playback, producing a variable-gain normalization, as opposed to the constant gain as rendered by ReplayGain. While dynamic range compression is beneficial in keeping volume constant, it changes the artistic intent of the recording.
- Sound Check is a proprietary Apple Inc. technology similar in function to ReplayGain. It is available in iTunes and on the iPod.
- Standard measurement algorithms for broadcast loudness monitoring applications were developed and released by the International Telecommunication Union (ITU-R BS.1770) and the European Broadcasting Union (EBU R128) in 2010 as part of the LUFS specification for units of loudness. This new method has been used to measure loudness in newer ReplayGain utilities such as foobar2000 (since 1.1.6) and loudgain.

== Implementations ==
Name	Platforms	Can write	Ref.
AIMP	Windows; Android	Yes	
Amarok	Linux; NetBSD; FreeBSD; macOS; Windows	Yes	
Amberol	Linux	No	
Audacious	Linux; Windows	No	
Banshee	Linux; macOS (beta); Windows (alpha)	Yes	
beaTunes	macOS; Windows	Yes	
BTR Amp	iOS/iPadOS	No	
Clementine	Linux; macOS; (32-bit) Windows	No	
cmus	Unix-like	Yes	
DeaDBeeF	Linux; macOS; Windows; Unix-like	Yes	
Exaile	Linux; Windows; macOS	No	
Ex Falso/Quod Libet	Linux; Windows; macOS	Yes	
foobar2000	Windows; iOS/iPadOS; Android; macOS	Yes	
JRiver Media Center	Windows; macOS; Linux	Yes	
JavaTunes	Java	No	
Kodi (software)	Windows; macOS; Android; iOS; tvOS; Linux; Xbox; *BSD	No	
Lightweight Music Server	Source code	Yes	
Lyrion Music Server	Debian; Windows; macOS; RPM package; Perl	No	
Loudgain	Source code	Yes	
MAD/madplay	Source code	Yes	
MediaMonkey	Windows; Android	Yes	
Mixxx (Note: Uses MAD.)	Windows; macOS; Linux	Yes	
mp3gain	Windows	Yes	
mpg123	Linux; Windows	No	
MPD	Windows; Linux	Yes	
mpv	Windows; macOS; Linux	No	
Muine	Linux; Unix-like	No	
MusicBee	Windows	Yes	
Nightingale	Linux; Windows; macOS	No	
PowerAMP	Android	No	
ProppFrexx ONAIR	Windows	Yes	
RadioBOSS	Windows	Yes	
Rockbox	Digital audio players	Yes	
SoX	Windows; Linux; macOS	Yes	
Vanilla Music	Android	No	
Vinyl Music Player	Android	No	
VLC media player	Windows; UWP; macOS; iOS; Apple TV; Linux; Android; FreeBSD	No	
Winamp	Windows	Yes	
XMPlay	Windows	Yes	
Zortam Mp3 Media Studio	Windows; Android	Maybe (Note: Exclusive to the Pro version on Windows.)	

== See also ==
- Alignment level
- Dialnorm
- EBU R 128
- Loudness war
