= Guayadeque Music Player =

Free software audio player

Guayadeque
- Original author: Juan Ríos
- Developer: Tiago T Barrionuevo
- Release: March 11, 2009; 17 years ago
- Stable release: 1.1.1 / November 11, 2026; 7 days ago
- Written in: C++ (wxWidgets)
- Operating system: Linux
- Available in: Bulgarian, Catalan, Croatian, Czech, Danish, Dutch, English, French, Georgian, German, Greek, Hungarian, Icelandic, Italian, Japanese, Lithuanian, Malay, Norwegian Bokmal, Polish, Portuguese, Portuguese Brazilian, Russian, Serbian, Slovak, Spanish, Swedish, Thai, Turkish, Ukrainian
- Type: Audio player
- License: GPL-3.0-or-later
- Website: codeberg.org/thothix/guayadeque
- Repository: codeberg.org/thothix/guayadeque

Guayadeque is a free software audio player written in C++ using the WxWidgets toolkit. It uses GStreamer to manage the audio and SQLite for the music metadata database.

== History ==
Juan Ríos began development of Guayadeque in 2008 after finding that no other music players could efficiently store a large collection of audio files. The first public release was in March 11, 2009.

A Qt rewrite of the program was planned in 2019, but on 29 September 2023, it was announced on the Guayadeque forums that development had ceased.

A continuation project was founded in 2024 by Tiago T Barrionuevo, returning Guayadeque to active development.

In January 05, 2026, the project was migrated from GitHub to Codeberg in this repository.

== Features ==
Guayadeque features a simple and customizable user interface with a large amount of fine-tuning options, while being lightweight on system resources.

Main features include:

- Supports a wide variety of audio formats including MP3, OGG/OGA, Opus, FLAC, WAV, WMA, MP4//M4A/M4B/M4P/MP1/MP2, MPGA (MPEG-1 Lossless), AAC, AIFF/AIFC, ASF, WV (Wavpack), MPC (Musepack Audio), APE (Monkey's Audio), TTA (TrueAudio), DSF/DFF (DSDIFF), 3GP/3G2, SPX (Speex) and Track modules (669, amf, ams, dbm, digi, dmf, dsm, gdm, far, imf, it, j2b, mdl, med, mod, mt2, mtm, okt, psm, ptm, sam, s3m, stm, stx, ult, umx, xm) and it also has support for ALSA.
- Multiple collections support. You can get separated sets of tracks (Library) with its configuration, layouts, playlists and so on.
- Multiple artists per track support.
- Read and write tags in all supported formats.
- Tracks tag editor with automatically fetching of tags information for easily completion.
- Smart play mode that add tracks that fit your music taste using the tracks currently in the playlist.
- Allow to catalogue your music using labels. Any track, artist or album can have as many labels you want.
- Allow fast access to any music file by genre, artist, album.
- Audio equalizer.
- Configurable cross fader engine.
- Configurable silence detector to avoid listening to silence between tracks.
- Dynamic and static playlists management.
- Play and rip audio CDs.
- CUE sheet support.
- Ability to download covers automatically or manually.
- Download of plain and synchronised lyrics from various lyrics providers.
- Rate tracks from 0 to 5 stars.
- Record from internet radios.
- Desktop notifications.
- MPRIS D-Bus interface support so it can be easily controlled from music applets for example.
- Allow to resume play status and position when closed and reopened.
- Allow to subscribe to podcasts and download all new episodes automatically or manually.
- Play and record Shoutcast radios.
- Allow searching for an artist or a track in Shoutcast radios.
- The ability to label tracks and edit track tags using MusicBrainz.
- Suggest music using Last.fm service.
- Last.fm audioscrobbling support.
- Easily expandable contextual links support. Find information about a track, an artist or an album on your favourite site.
- Easily expandable contextual commands support. Set of preconfigured commands like an option to record the album in a burning application.
- Create custom commands easily.
- Option to copy the selection you want to a directory or device like USB players and IPod using a configurable pattern you added.
- Partial GNOME session support to detect when GNOME session is about to close and save the play list so it can continue next time with the same tracks.
- projectM music visualizer, dockable and fullscreen.
- VU meters.
- Automatic configuration, collections and layouts backups.
- Available in 29 languages.
- ... and many more.

== See also ==
- Software audio players (free software)
- Rhythmbox
- Amarok (media player)
