= DeaDBeeF =

Audio player

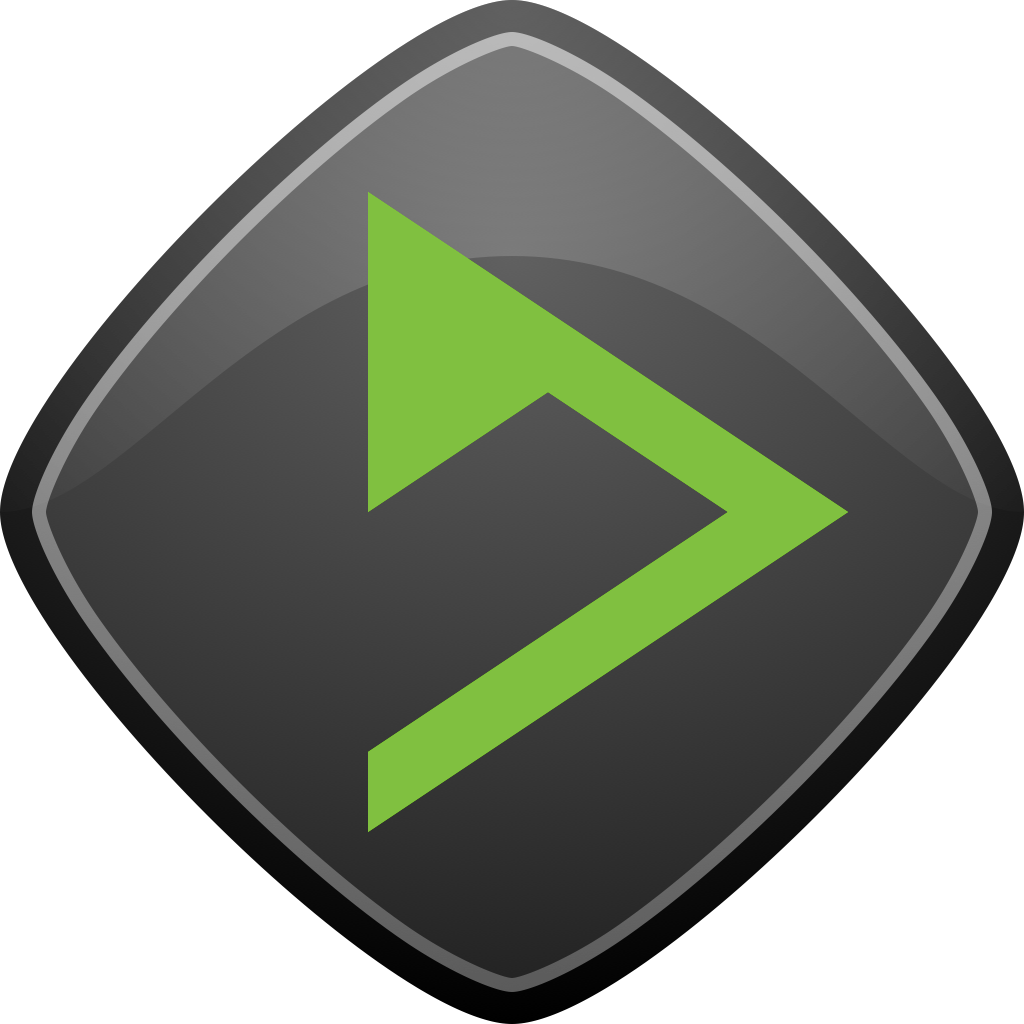

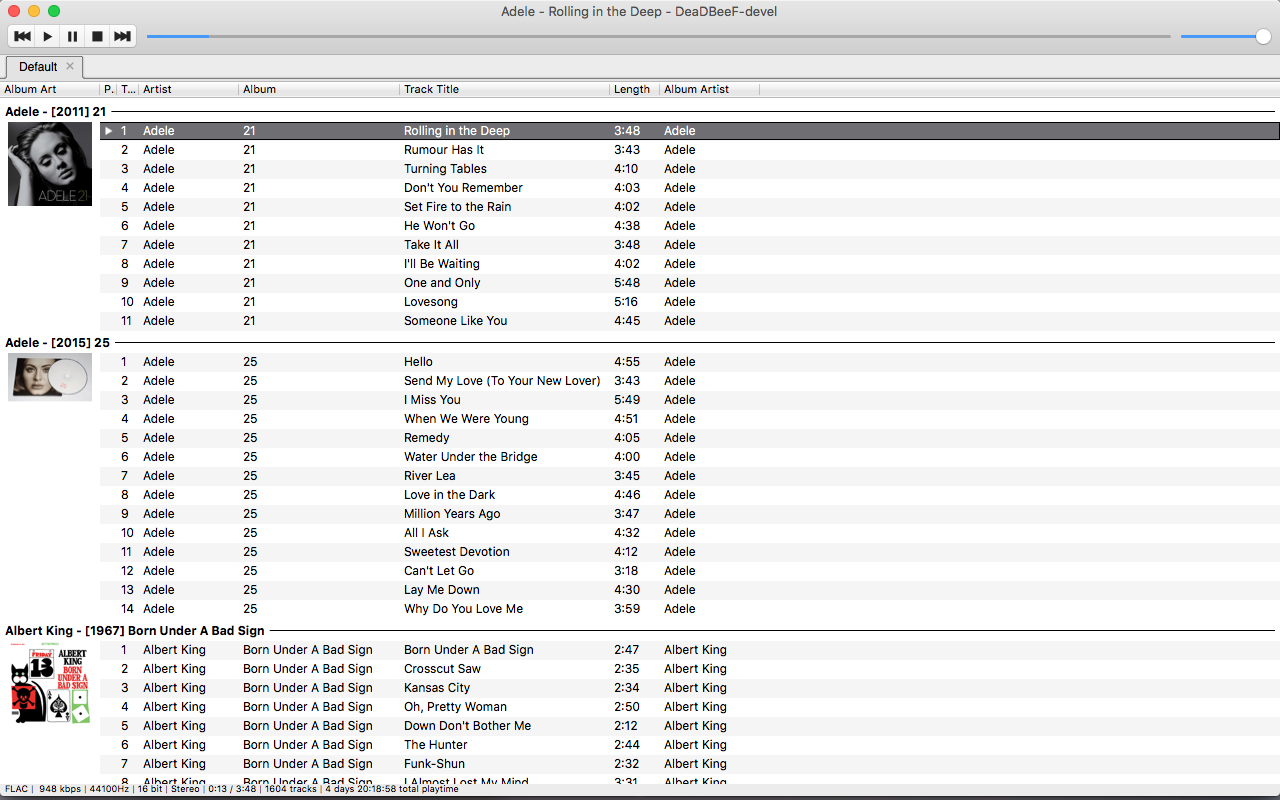
- DeaDBeeF's main window on Mac OS
- Original author: Oleksiy Yakovenko
- Initial release: August 2009
- Stable release: 1.10.0 / 25 March 2025; 9 months ago
- Repository: github.com/DeaDBeeF-Player/deadbeef
- Written in: C, C++, Objective-C, Assembly language
- Operating system: Unix-like (Linux, *BSD, OpenSolaris), macOS, Windows, Android
- Platform: x86, x86-64, ARM
- Type: Audio player
- License: GPLv2, LGPLv2.1, zlib, various free and open-source software licenses (plugins)
- Website: deadbeef.sourceforge.io

DeaDBeeF is an audio player software available for Windows, Linux and other Unix-like operating systems. An ad-supported Android version is available, but has not been updated since 2017. DeaDBeeF is free and open-source software, except on Android.

== History ==
The player was first published in August 2009. Its author cited dissatisfaction with existing music players under Linux as the main reason for writing DeaDBeeF. The name is a reference to the magic number 0xDEADBEEF.

== Characteristics ==
Among DeaDBeeF's functionalities are included:

- Support for formats MP3, FLAC, APE, TTA, Vorbis, WavPack, Musepack, AAC, ALAC, WMA, WAV, DTS, audio CD, many forms of module files and music from game consoles. TAK and Opus are supported via ffmpeg/libav.
- Cuesheet support, both in built-in format and external files. iso.wv support.
- Character encodings Windows-1251 and ISO 8859-1 are supported in addition to UTF-8.
- The program doesn't have any dependencies on GNOME, KDE or gstreamer.
- Plug-in architecture.
- Gapless playback.
- Customizable systemd notifications (OSD).
- Read and write support for playlists in format M3U and PLS.
- Network playback of podcasts using SHOUTcast, Icecast, MMS, HTTP and FTP.
- Customizable global keyboard shortcuts.
- Tag support (read and write) for ID3v1, ID3v2, APEv2, Vorbis comments, iTunes.
- Mass tagging and flexible tagging (custom tags).
- High-quality resampling.
- Bit-perfect output under certain configurations.
- Sound output via ALSA, PulseAudio, PipeWire and OSS.
- Scrobbling to last.fm, libre.fm or any GNU FM server.
- En masse transcoder.
- ReplayGain support.
- Multi-channel playback.
- 18-band equalizer.
- Simple command-line user interface as well as graphical user interface implemented in GTK+ (version 2 or 3). The GUI is fully customizable.

== See also ==
- Comparison of audio player software
