= Quintessential Player =

Freeware media player for Microsoft Windows

- Quintessential Media Player version 5.0
- Developer(s): Paul Quinn (Quinnware)
- Initial release: ?
- Final release: 5.0.121 (February 18, 2009; 16 years ago) [±]
- Preview release: None [±]
- Written in: ?
- Operating system: Windows
- Available in: ?
- Type: Media player
- License: Proprietary
- Website: www.quinnware.com

Quintessential Player (also called QMP and formerly QCD) was a freeware, multi-format media player developed by Paul Quinn.

Quintessential Player began life in 1997 as a CD-only player for Windows, when it was known as Quintessential CD Player (hence the 'QCD' moniker associated with the player). Over the years, Quintessential Player gained support for playing MP3s and other audio formats, video playback, and an optional media library was added to the player. This latter addition gave rise to the use of the name Quintessential Media Player, or QMP for short. PC World Magazine named Quintessential Player as one of their choices for 'Best Media Player', and it was also selected for inclusion in the Pricelessware list of best freeware.

It was the only way of submitting audio metadata (on CD tracks, artists, etc. as created by a tag editor) to Gracenote's CD database other than iTunes, and was still listed as such even in 2019.

== Features ==
Quintessential Player natively supported:

- MP3, Ogg, WAV, and CD Playback
- Video Playback with the aid of External Codecs
- Full Speed CD Ripping
- MP3 Encoding
- Streaming Audio
- Tag Editing
- Gracenote CDDB
- Crossfading & EQ
- Multiple Visualizations
- Skins and Plugins

A wide range of audio formats playable via the use of plugins, Audioscrobbler support (also supplied via a plugin) and many more skins allowing the customization of the players interface were obtainable from the Quinnware site.

Quintessential Player also had fully functional Windows profile support and did not require administrator user access to run properly.

== See also ==
- Comparison of audio player software
