= Desktop organizer =

Desktop organizer software applications are applications that automatically create useful organizational structures from desktop content, including heterogeneous types of content including email, files, contacts, companies, RSS news feeds, photos, music and chat sessions. The organization is based on a combination of automated scanning of metadata similar to data mining and manual tagging of content. The metadata stored in applications is correlated based on a structure for the data type handled by the organizer tool. For example, the email address of a sender of an email allows the email to be filed in a virtual folder for the author and company the author works for or a music file is filed by the musician and album label. The resulting visualization simplifies use of desktop content to navigate, search, and use related information stored on the desktop computer. The data in desktop organizer tools is normally stored in a database rather than the computer's file system in order to produce virtual folders where the same item can appear in multiple folders to the user based on its relationship to the folder.

Desktop organizers are related to desktop search because both sets of tools allow users to locate desktop resources. The primary differences between the two are that desktop organizers perform post-search functionality related to the primary purpose of the organizer, offer manual taxonomy creation and tagging by the desktop user, and help gather additional related resources for taxonomy or related content from Internet resources.

== Communications organizers ==
Organization tools of contacts and correspondences involve the tracking and management of information stored in multiple communications tools. Due to the rise of computers for use in communications including email, VoIP applications like Skype, chat, web browsers, blogs, RSS and CRM content relating to companies and contacts is often spread across multiple applications. Desktop communications organizers collect and correlate information stored in these applications.

Common features of communications organizers include:

- Connectivity through scanners and listeners to communications tools including email, chat, bookmarks, and VoIP
- RSS newsfeed subscriptions
- Filing of desktop files and documents
- Connectivity to desktop search or desktop search capabilities
- Virtual folders to locate the same item in multiple locations
- Workflow utilities to mark items for follow-up and annotate items

== Picture organizers ==
Also referred to as image viewers, picture organizers provide utilities to file and view pictures in folders and to tag pictures with metadata for future use. Picture organizers may also integrate with photo sharing sites that also organize pictures but through a social network.

There are two classes of picture organizers:

- Automatic picture organizers. These are software packages that read data present in digital pictures and use this data to automatically create an organization structure. Each digital picture contains information about the date when the picture was taken. It is this piece of information that serves as the basis for automatic picture organization. The user usually has little or no control over the automatically created organization structure. Some tools create this structure on the hard drive (physical structure), while other tools create a virtual structure (it exists only within the tool).
- Manual picture organizers. This kind of software provides a direct view of the folders present on a user's hard disk. Sometimes referred to as image viewers, they only allow the user to see the pictures but do not provide any automatic organization features. They give maximum flexibility to a user and show exactly what the user has created on his hard drive. While they provide maximum flexibility, manual organizers rely on the user to have his/her own method to organize their pictures. Currently there are two main methods for organizing pictures manually: tag and folder based methods. While not mutually exclusive, these methods are different in their methodology, outcome and purpose.

Presently, many commercial image organization software offer both automatic and manual picture organization features. A comparison of image viewers reveals that many freely available software packages are available that offer most of the organization features available in commercial software. However, not all image viewers offer organizational tools. Popular picture organizers include Google's Google Photos, DigiKam, Adobe Systems's Elements, Apple's Photos, Phase One's Media Pro 1 and Novell's F-spot.

Common key organizational tools provided by picture organizers are:

- Organization by date or date range
- Tagging of pictures with attributes including location, people, and
- Storing the same picture in multiple virtual folders
- Rating of pictures

== Music organizers ==
Music contains unique attributes such as artist, album, genre, era, and song title used to organize the songs. The desktop organization of music is primarily embedded into audio players and media players like Amarok, Rhythmbox, Banshee, MediaMonkey, Songbird, and Apple's Music app. Organization is used to create playlists, or to organize the media collection into a folder hierarchy, by specific artists, albums, or genres.

Another type of music organizer allow a user to organize their media collection directly without listening to music.

By connecting the audio players to databases of tagged music to compare a collection with a professionally organized and tagged collection of music, MP3 collections can be enhanced with metadata corrections to support the organization process when metadata is not complete in the original items.
