= Guayadeque =

Guayadeque is the name of:

- Barranco de Guayadeque, Gully and National Monument on Gran Canaria
- Guayadeque Music Player
