= Sonique =

Sonique may refer to:

- Sonique (musician) (born 1965), British DJ and singer
- Sonique (media player), a media player for Windows
- Kylie Sonique Love (formerly known as Sonique, born 1983), American performer and transgender activist
- Villette Sonique, a yearly music festival in Parc de la Villette in Paris, France
