= Style Jukebox =

Former Hi-fi high-resolution audio cloud music streaming and storage player

Style Jukebox - High-Resolution Music Streaming
- Release: September 5, 2013
- Operating system: Windows, Windows 8, iOS, Android, Windows Phone, Web browser
- Available in: English, German, Dutch, Spanish, Romanian and Bulgarian
- Type: Media player, music platform
- Website: www.stylejukebox.com

Style Jukebox was a hi-fi high-resolution audio cloud music streaming and storage player for the Windows, iOS, Android and Windows Phone platforms. A Web Player was also available for Mac, Windows and Linux.

Style Jukebox allowed users to upload their personal music collection from their computer to Style Jukebox servers and listen to them from another compatible device (Android, iOS, Windows, Mac, and Windows Phone) by streaming or downloading songs for offline playback.

Basic accounts had 10 GB of storage. Pro accounts could have up to 2 TB of music.

As of July 2016, Style Jukebox had more than 250,000 registered users.

On December 1, 2017, Style Jukebox discontinued their service with a very small post on their home page, and no further details were released.

== Features ==
- Native music applications for Windows, iOS, Android and Windows Phone.
- Automatic import from Dropbox, OneDrive and Google Drive available on Web, Windows, iOS and Windows Phone
- Special upload native software is available for Macs
- Store up to 2 TB of music as a Pro user
- Stream music playlist over cellular data/ WiFi
- Reduce data plan by downloading song on the phone. Selective download
- Support for most popular music file formats: MP3, AAC, WMA, OGC, M4A and lossless FLAC, AIFF, APE, WAV and ALAC (ALAC)
- File size up to 1 GB
- Audio quality up to 24bit/192kHz/7.1 surround
- Browse music by Songs, Albums, Artists, Genres and Composers.
- Edit song title, album title, artist name and genre from Style Jukebox or Windows or Style Jukebox Web Player.
- Support for lossless audio playback on Chromecast (Google Cast)

== Technology ==
Style Jukebox consisted of cloud-based services for user management, music storage and programmatic interfaces (APIs); and clients for music streaming and storage on desktop and mobile operating systems.

Upload was available on the desktop client only; Style Jukebox enabled users to drop music files and folders in the music player to be automatically uploaded and synced with Style Jukebox cloud-based services and made available to any other of the user's computers and devices that also have the Style Jukebox client installed.

Style Jukebox cloud-based services automatically transcoded formats to match the device's supported formats. For example, a 320 kbit/s WMA was transcoded to 320 kbit/s MP3 on iOS devices and FLAC lossless was transcoded to WMA lossless on Windows Phone devices.
