= MediaMonkey =

Digital media player

- MediaMonkey 2024 screenshot
- Developer: Ventis Media Inc.

Stable release(s)
- Windows: 2024.0.0.3082 / 5 December 2024

Preview release(s) [±]
- 2024.1.0.3103 Alpha (January 15, 2025; 21 months ago) [±]
- Operating system: Android, Microsoft Windows
- Type: Media player
- License: Freemium
- Website: www.mediamonkey.com

MediaMonkey is a digital media player and media library application developed by Ventis Media Inc., for organizing and playing audio on Microsoft Windows and Android operating systems. MediaMonkey for Windows (sometimes noted as MMW) includes various management tools, and is extensible using plugins, while MediaMonkey for Android (often referred to as MMA) is an adjunct for sharing the library with Android devices. MediaMonkey is commonly displayed/marketed as a solution for managing large libraries of music.

MediaMonkey uses the freemium licensing model. The base program is available as freeware but a premium "Gold" license unlocks additional features such as the ability to have multiple media collections, organize files automatically, and others.

== Features ==
=== Audio CDs ===
Music can be ripped from audio CDs and encoded into most supported formats. Music can be burned to CD/DVD discs in compressed form as a data disc or decompressed to create an audio CD.

=== Supported formats ===
MediaMonkey supports playback of MP3, AAC, OGG, WMA, FLAC, MPC, APE, and WAV audio files. It can adjust volume levels automatically using ReplayGain and MP3Gain.

=== Music library ===
MediaMonkey's music library attempts to organize and categorize a user's music collection. Upon installation, it will scan the user's hard drives for music files and add them to its library. Ratings and playback information can be imported from other media players such as Winamp and Windows Media Player. Podcasts are supported through the Podcatcher which allows the user to subscribe to podcasts that MediaMonkey will automatically download. It can also monitor the user's hard drive to ensure that any changes are automatically updated in the library.

=== Device sync ===
MediaMonkey can sync music files with most portable audio devices including the Apple iPod, Apple iPhone, Palm Pre, and Android-based devices.

=== Addons ===
MediaMonkey has support for third-party plugins to extend the base functionality. Available plugins include a Last.fm scrobbler, a plugin to show lyrics, and a web remote-control interface. MediaMonkey also supports the Winamp 2 API, allowing a user to use many of the input, output, DSP, and visualization plugins developed for Winamp. (Note: General, DSP, and visualization Winamp plugins are supported in MediaMonkey 3 and 4 only.)

== History ==
=== Songs-DB ===
MediaMonkey was first developed in 2001 under the name Songs-DB. Songs-DB version 1.0.0 was released on October 12, 2001. Development progressed steadily with version 1.1 released June 7, 2002. Songs-DB 1.1 was the first version to provide Winamp plugin support. Version 1.2 was released on July 3, 2002, and included improved Winamp plugin support, significant UI improvements, and scripting support. Version 1.3 was released on October 31, 2002, and added Ogg Vorbis support and the ability to burn CDs.

=== MediaMonkey 2 ===
For version 2.0, Songs-DB was renamed to MediaMonkey. MediaMonkey 2.0 was released on August 25, 2003. MediaMonkey 2.2, released on June 9, 2004, added iTunes-like device synchronization. This synchronization functionality was extended to include syncing to actual iPods in version 2.4, released June 5, 2005. The last major release of the 2.x series was MediaMonkey 2.5, released on December 28, 2005. MediaMonkey 2.5 added improved synchronization for all current iPod, Creative Labs, and iRiver devices, along with full FLAC support. Minor releases of MediaMonkey continued for the next year, culminating in MediaMonkey 2.5.5 which was released on January 30, 2007.

=== MediaMonkey 3 ===
MediaMonkey 3.0.1 was released on December 25, 2007. MediaMonkey 3 was designed specifically with large user libraries in mind. This was seen in version 3.0.3, released on June 19, 2008, which increased the supported library size to 100,000+ tracks (from a previously advertised 50,000 tracks).

=== MediaMonkey 4 ===
MediaMonkey 4.0 was released on December 16, 2011. This version introduced better synchronization with Android devices, library sharing over DLNA / UPnP, improved audio output via WASAPI, the ability to run from a USB stick, and secure CD ripping.

MediaMonkey 4.1.0 was released Jan 31, 2014. This version introduced wireless synchronization with MediaMonkey for Android and bi-directional synchronization, a darker look and feel, and UPnP improvements.

The current version is MediaMonkey 4.1.29, released in July 2020.

=== MediaMonkey 5 ===
MediaMonkey 5.0 entered a public beta on December 20, 2016. This version uses the Chromium rendering engine and HTML for its user interface, as opposed to previous versions' natively rendered interface.

=== MediaMonkey Server ===
Alpha testing for an open-source, server-only implementation of MediaMonkey was publicly announced on August 15, 2018. Clients connect to the MediaMonkey server (MMS) from either a web browser or MediaMonkey 5 beta, to access and manage the media library. According to the developer Rusty, "We created it because UPnP doesn't scale sufficiently for our users, and because DB sharing hacks weren't sufficiently robust."

== Assessments ==
MediaMonkey has been widely recognized for many years as a leading tool for organizing and managing large libraries of digital music, praised for its automatic functions and other powerful capabilities. It is criticized for having an outdated user interface and being difficult to learn.

== See also ==
- Comparison of audio player software
- Comparison of feed aggregators
- Comparison of video player software
- List of feed aggregators
- Tag editor
