= IView =

IView or iView may refer to:

- ABC iview, a video on demand and catch up TV service run by the Australian Broadcasting Corporation
- IrfanView, an image viewer, editor, organiser and converter program
- iView Media, a commercial digital asset management cataloging program
- IView Multimedia, a former software company
