= MusikCube =

Open source audio software

musikcube
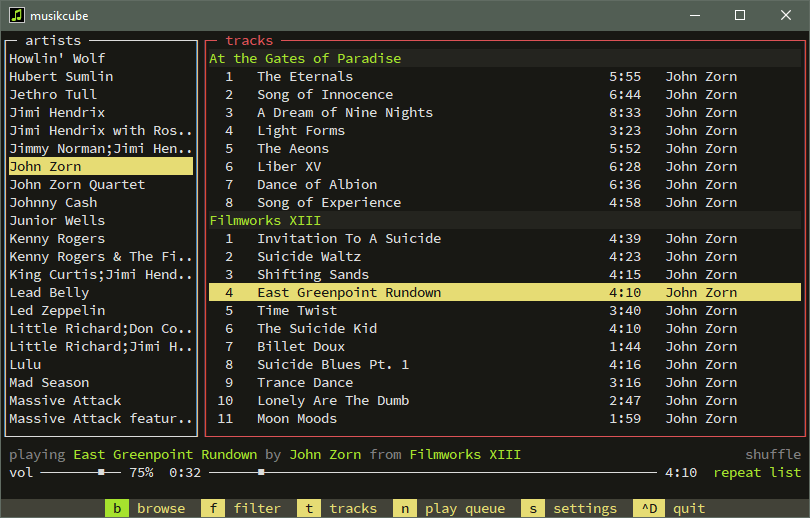
- musikcube screenshot
- Developer: Casey Langen
- Release: July 29, 2004
- Stable release: 3.0.5 / 21 September 2025
- Written in: C++ (nCurses)
- Operating system: Microsoft Windows, MacOS, Linux, FreeBSD
- Available in: English, French, Deutsch
- Type: Audio player
- License: BSD-3-Clause
- Website: musikcube.com
- Repository: github.com/clangen/musikcube

musikcube is a free and open-source cross-platform, terminal-based audio player software and streaming server.

== Features ==
musikcube is based on a modular plug-in architecture, and uses plug-ins written in C++. Plug-ins provide core functionality for audio decoding, data streaming, output device handling, metadata parsing, digital signal processing, and more. MP3 and Ogg Vorbis are natively supported, while plugins exist to provide support for many popular audio codecs, including M4A, WMA and FLAC.

Internally, musikcube uses the SQLite database library for storing track and playlist metadata.

There is currently no support for Digital rights management.

musikcube is capable of streaming audio via an integrated server. An Android client also exists, allowing music to be streamed over local and wide-area networks.

== See also ==
- Music Player Daemon
- Music on Console
- Comparison of audio player software
