= Sayonara Player =

- Developer: Michael Lugmair (until 2020 the pseudonym Lucio Carreras has been used)
- Release: 2011
- Stable release: 1.11.0-stable1 / April 18, 2025; 18 months ago
- Written in: C++
- Operating system: Linux, BSD
- Type: Audio player
- License: GPL-3.0-or-later
- Website: sayonara-player.com
- Repository: gitlab.com/luciocarreras/sayonara-player

The Sayonara Player is an audio software player for Linux and BSD.

== History ==
Its developer, Michael Lugmair, used the Qt widget toolkit as well as the multimedia framework GStreamer, to develop the player. Sayonara is free software under the GPL-3.0-or-later license.

== Characteristics ==
=== Installation ===
Sayonara can typically be installed under Linux with the distribution-specific package management. For some Linux distributions, including Ubuntu and Fedora, installation instructions are available on the website of the player. The package is listed in the Arch Linux repository.

=== User interface ===
The Sayonara player has a graphical user interface. A dark mode is included in the skin. The window is divided into the player itself, where controls, track data and the cover can be seen, the playlist, and the music library. The library is structured as follows: Either a tabular listing of artists and albums or a cover view. Sayonara can manage several playlists.

=== Database ===
Large music collections can be managed in one or more databases. The database reads most common tag fields including the rating tag. The results of a search query are displayed either as quickly as possible during entering or after confirmation with the enter key.

== Scope of functions ==
Some functions of the player are:

- Music playback with Crossfader and Equalizer
- Frequency spectrum and level display
- Music database with search function, cover display and genre filter
- Management of several databases
- Management of multiple playlists
- Last.fm Scrobbling: Automatic addition of songs to the playlist
- Access to web streams and podcasts
- Cover display: support for integrated covers and online services
- Metadata Editor
- Display of lyrics (retrievable from different web services)
- Player available in various languages
