= Cog (software) =

Audio player for macOS

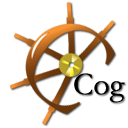

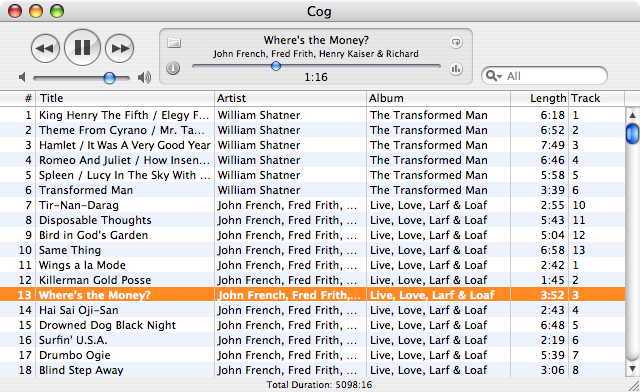
- Cog 0.07 (r909)
- Developer: Vincent Spader
- Initial release: 0.01 (2005-06-02)
- Stable release: 0.07 (December 24, 2007; 18 years ago) [±]
- Preview release: 0.08 (r2051) (February 7, 2013; 13 years ago) [±]
- Written in: Objective-C \ Cocoa
- Operating system: macOS 10.4+ (Tiger and above)
- Available in: Multiple Languages
- Type: Audio player
- License: GPL-2.0-only
- Website: cogx.org
- Repository: bitbucket.org/vspader/cog

Cog is an open source audio player for macOS. Along with supporting most audio formats compatible with macOS's Core Audio API, Cog supports a wide array of other audio formats, along with their metadata, which are otherwise unsupported on macOS.

As the original project appears to be abandoned, with the website last updated in 2008, there are now several forks of the project maintained by others. In 2013, Christopher Snowhill started a fork and continues to maintain and develop it as of 2026.

== See also ==
- Comparison of audio player software
