= JuK =

Free audio player from the KDE project

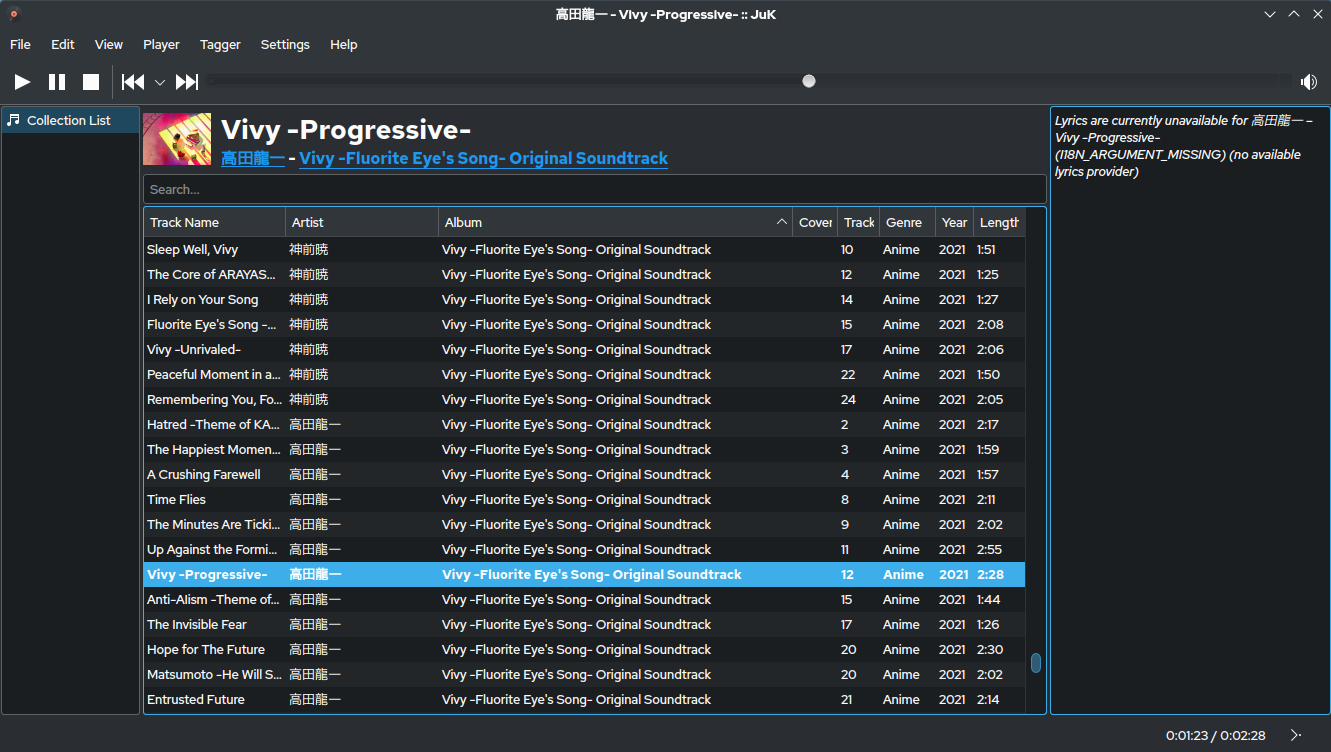
- Screenshot of JuK
- Original author: Scott Wheeler
- Developer: Michael Pyne
- Release: February 3, 2004; 22 years ago
- Stable release: 24.08.0 / 22 August 2024; 2 years ago
- Preview release: 21.07.80 / 16 July 2021; 5 years ago
- Written in: C++
- Operating system: Unix-like, Microsoft Windows
- Available in: Various
- Type: Audio player
- License: GPL-2.0-or-later
- Website: juk.kde.org www.kde.org/applications/multimedia/juk/
- Repository: invent.kde.org/multimedia/juk

JuK is a free software audio player by KDE, the default player since K Desktop Environment 3.2. JuK supports collections of MP3, Ogg Vorbis, and FLAC audio files.

JuK was started by Scott Wheeler in 2000, and was originally called QTagger; however, it was not until 2002 that the application was moved into KDE CVS, where it has grown into a mature audio application. It was first officially part of KDE in KDE 3.2.

== Features ==
Though an able music player, JuK is primarily an audio jukebox application, with a strong focus on management of music, as shown by features such as:

- Collection list and multiple user defined playlists.
- Ability to scan directories to automatically import playlists (.m3u files) and music files on start up.
- Dynamic Search Playlists that are automatically updated as fields in the collection change.
- A Tree View mode where playlists are automatically generated for sets of albums, artists and genres.
- Playlist history to indicate which files have been played and when.
- Inline search for filtering the list of visible items.
- The ability to guess tag information from the file name or using MusicBrainz online lookup.
- File renamer that can rename files based on the tag content.
- ID3v1, ID3v2 and Ogg Vorbis tag reading and editing support (via TagLib).
