= XMMS =

Free and open source audio player

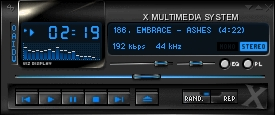
- Developer: XMMS Team
- Release: November 1997
- Final release: 1.2.11 (November 16, 2007; 18 years ago) [±]
- Preview release: none (none) [±]
- Written in: C, C++ (GTK+ 1.x)
- Operating system: Unix-like
- Type: Audio player
- License: GPL-2.0-or-later
- Website: web.archive.org/web/20231229042135/https://xmms.org/

X Multimedia System (XMMS) is an audio player for Unix-like systems released under a free software license.

== History ==
XMMS was originally written as x11amp by Peter and Mikael Alm in November 1997. The player was made to resemble Winamp, which was first released in May that year. x11amp received Winamp skin support in version 0.7 on May 6, 1998. Though the original release was made under a license that did not provide any access to the program's source code, it is now released under the GPL-2.0-or-later.

On June 10, 1999, 4Front Technologies decided to sponsor x11amp development and the project was renamed to XMMS - the name being an acronym for X MultiMedia System. Most XMMS users take this to mean "X11 MultiMedia System" or "X Window System MultiMedia System"; the official interpretation of the "X" is "Cross-platform".

In 2002, Peter Alm initiated the XMMS2 project, aiming to produce a successor to XMMS using all new code and devoted solely to audio playback.

The final version of the player was released in November 2007. After it its development and support were ceased, modern Linux distributions no longer offer it.

=== Forks ===
XMMS continued to use GTK+ 1.x toolkit, despite newer versions of the toolkit being released. The primary reason for this reluctance to upgrade was that many XMMS plugins (written by third parties) were dependent on the older version of GTK+ to properly function, e.g., "about" boxes and configuration dialogs. Many software developers considered the XMMS codebase to be poorly designed and difficult to maintain. This led to forks and related projects:

- The Beep Media Player, a fork of XMMS code that uses GTK+ 2, started around 2003
  - Youki, the remade continuation of Beep Media Player, started around the end of 2005
  - Audacious, a fork from Beep Media Player started around 2005 when Beep Media Player development ceased in favor of Youki
- A GTK+2 based fork by Mohammed Sameer, named XMMS2. It is unrelated to the current XMMS2 project, which uses a new codebase and client/server architecture not derived from XMMS.
- In 2026 Christian Schaller from Red Hat, part of his experiments with AI, revived the project and rewritten it for GTK4/PipeWire. It was named XMMS Resuscitated.

== Features ==
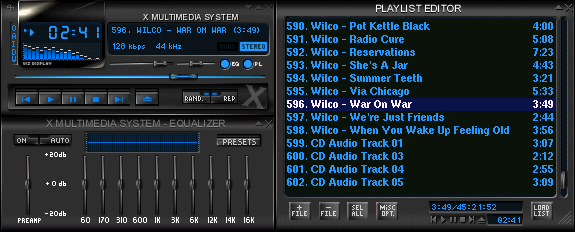
XMMS's default theme. Here the three windows have been docked together. The top left box is the main control panel; the bottom left is the optional equalizer, and the right box is the playlist editor.

XMMS supported the following audio formats:

- AAC support is provided by the FAAD2 library, supporting m4a files
- APE Monkey's Audio Codec .ape files — support provided by the mac-port project plugin
- Audio CD, including CDDB via FreeDB lookup
- FLAC via a plugin
- Icecast and SHOUTcast streaming
- libmikmod supported formats (including .XM, .MOD, .IT)
- JACK plug-in for support of the JACK Audio Connection Kit
- ModPlug plug-in for playing .MOD, .S3M, .XM, .IT and other tracker formats
- mp3PRO support via a third-party plugin (which does not support SHOUTcast title streaming)
- MPEG Layer 1, 2, and 3 (also known as MP3), using the mpg123 library
- Musepack support using XMMS-Musepack plugin
- OGG Vorbis support via by a plug-in provided by xiph.org
- SHN support via a plug-in provided by etree
- speex speech compression format via a plugin
- TTA support via a third-party plugin
- Support for most Amiga music formats via UADE plug-in
- WAV support
- WavPack support via a third-party plugin
- Limited WMA support via a third-party plugin

=== Skins ===
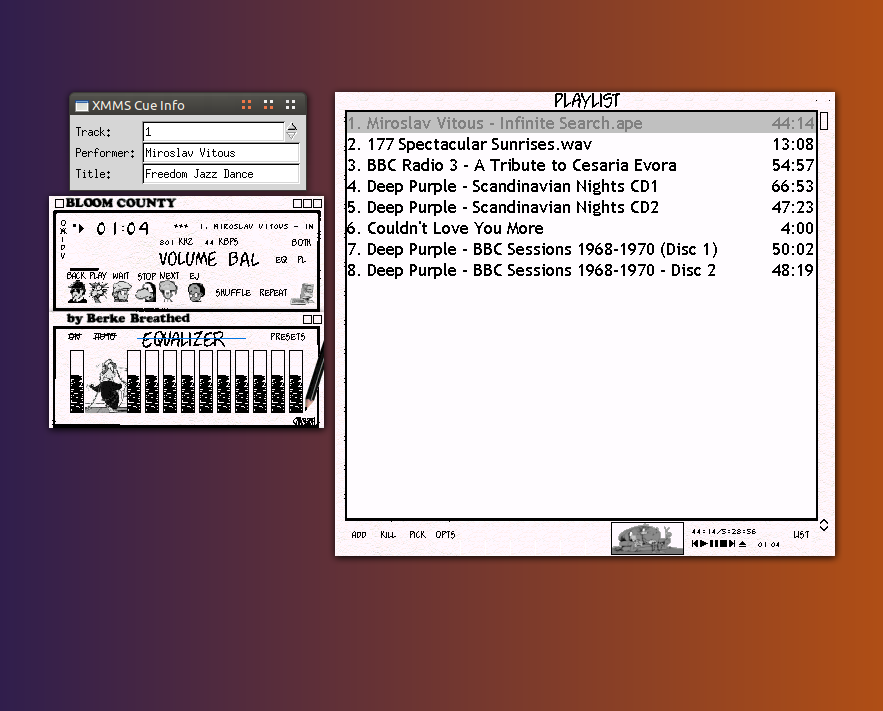
Xmms skinned with imported wsz on Ubuntu 11.10 with cue info activated.

XMMS came with its own skin, but any WSZ (WinAMP 2) classic skin can be used to customize the player.

=== Coverviewer ===
Xmms with xmms-coverviewer in action on Ubuntu 11.10.

xmms-coverviewer is an XMMS plugin which allows XMMS to display album art and further enhance the graphical interface of the player.
