= AIMP =

Audio player software developed by Artem Izmaylov

- AIMP4 interface, using the Bliss skin
- Developers: Artem Izmaylov and Mike Green
- Release: August 8, 2006; 20 years ago
- Stable release: 5.40.2716 (April 21, 2026; 5 months ago)
- Operating system: Windows Vista or later, Android, Linux
- Type: Audio player
- License: Proprietary software
- Website: aimp.ru

AIMP is a freeware audio player for Windows, Android and Linux originally developed by Russian developer Artem Izmaylov (Russian: Артём Измайлов, romanized: Artyom Izmajlov). It supports a variety of audio codecs, and includes tools to convert audio files and edit their metadata. It also has the capability of installing user-made skins and plugins. After its release, it has been well received by different parties.

== Development ==
The first version of AIMP was released on August 8, 2006 and was named after its creator: Artem Izmaylov Media Player. AIMP was initially based on the audio library BASS, developed by XMPlay and MO3 developers Un4seen Developments. Version 3 added a new audio engine and full support for ReplayGain, and revamped the music library interface transparency effects.

== See also ==
- Comparison of audio player software
