= Ecoute (application) =

Music player for macOS and iOS

- Original author: Louka Desroziers Julien Sagot
- Developer: PixiApps
- Stable release: 3.0.8 (macOS) 2.5.7 (iOS)
- Operating system: macOS, iOS
- Platform: Mac OS X Snow Leopard Mac OS X Lion OS X Mountain Lion iOS 6 iOS 7 iOS 8
- Size: 7.5 MB (macOS) 3.2 MB (iOS)
- Website: ecoute.juliensagot.fr

Ecoute was a standalone music player application for macOS and iOS, released by PixiApps. It was created by Louka Desroziers (Developer) and Julien Sagot (Interface Designer). The app's X page states, as of December 2025, that it has been "discontinued." The last versions were 3.0.8 for macOS and 2.5.7 for iOS.

== Mac version ==
Ecoute played content, including music, videos, and podcasts, from the iTunes library. The application did not require iTunes to be launched while it used iTunes' music library, playlists, and related information such as MP3 metatags. Users were able to switch back and forth between using Ecoute and iTunes. Ecoute did not require separately importing music or information; it used the same files as iTunes.

Ecoute was a lightweight player. Features included the ability to search for missing artwork, and customizable themes. Users were able to share information about the music they are listening to on Facebook, Twitter, and Last.fm. Ecoute supported Growl alerts, so the listener could see exactly what was playing.

The Desktop Controller was a very simple controller that sat in the background of the desktop. It showed the album artwork, along with the details of the track currently playing and provided access to the music navigation controls.

== iOS version ==
Ecoute for iOS served as a music player with Twitter integration, AirPlay support, music filters, podcast support, and more.

== Development timeline ==
20 August 2012 - The makers of Ecoute launched an official iPhone app in the App Store.

Late 2013 - Version 2 of the iOS app was released, with a makeover to take advantage of iOS 7, which had been released in September 2013.

January 2014 - Version 2.1 of the iOS app, which added queue management features, became available.

January 2019 - A comparative review of iOS music player apps called Ecoute "the once gold-standard music player" but said it was "close to abandonware at this point," since it had last been updated in 2016.

25 April 2019 - Ecoute's iOS app was last updated on this date, according to the AppAdvice site.

January 2020 - A new version of the above-cited comparative review disqualified Ecoute from its competition for receiving "just three tiny bug fixes in 2019."

As of December 2025 - The app's X page said the app has been "Discontinued," and Ecoute is no longer available in Apple's app stores for iOS or MacOS. Both versions of the app remains available for download, however, from third-party download sites.

== Reviews ==
Lukas Hermann's August 2012 review for MacStories was headlined, "Ecoute Is The Best Music Player For iOS. Period." He praised Ecoute as "a minimalist, easy to use iTunes replacement with iconic UI and many cool hotkey and playback features" and wrote, "This is what caring about good UI is really about."

Nick Mead from Softonic summarised his review as: "Ecoute is an excellent, lightweight alternative to the increasingly bloated issues that you may have been having with iTunes". Federico Viticci from MacStories described the Mac OS X version of Ecoute as a "small, powerful alternative to iTunes". Shane Richmond for The Daily Telegraph also praised the iOS application, saying that it is "much more pleasant and user-friendly design than Apple's iPod app".
