= Music Player Daemon =

Free and open-source software

- Developer: Max Kellermann
- Release: 2003; 23 years ago
- Stable release: 0.24.12 / 15 May 2026; 41 days ago
- Preview release: none [±]
- Written in: C++ (since 0.18)
- Operating system: Unix-like (BSDs, Linux, macOS,…) Windows
- Type: Audio player
- License: GPL-2.0-or-later
- Website: www.musicpd.org
- Repository: github.com/MusicPlayerDaemon/MPD

Music Player Daemon (MPD) is a free and open-source music player server. It plays audio files, organizes playlists and maintains a music database. In order to interact with it, a client program is needed. The MPD distribution includes mpc, a simple command-line client.

MPD is used in proprietary audio hardware. The MPD project maintains a list of vendors, some of which infringe the GPL.

== Design ==
MPD simply runs in the background playing music from its playlist. Client programs communicate with MPD to manipulate playback, the playlist, and the database. It is not a full-featured music player program such as Amarok, but its clients can serve such role.

MPD uses a flat file database to maintain the basic music file information when it is not running. Once the daemon has been started, the database is kept completely in-memory, and no hard disk access is necessary to look up or search for local audio files. Generally, music files must be located in a sub-directory of the music directory and are only added to the database when the update command is sent to the server. Playback of arbitrary files is allowed but only for local clients which are connected to the server via a Unix domain socket. MPD does not provide a built-in tag editor; this functionality is handled by clients or external programs, though 3rd-party patches do exist to add this functionality to the server.

The client–server model provides several advantages over all-inclusive music players. Clients may communicate with the server remotely over an intranet or over the Internet. The server can be a headless computer located anywhere on the network. Music playback can continue seamlessly when not using X or restarting X. Different clients can be used for different purposes – a lightweight client left open all the time for controlling playback with a more fully featured client used for intensive database searches. Several clients can use the same database, running simultaneously, remotely or under different user accounts.

== Features ==
- Plays Ogg Vorbis, FLAC, Opus, WavPack, MP2, MP3, MP4/AAC, MOD, Musepack, wave files and any other files supported by FFmpeg.
- Remotely control MPD over a network (IPv4 and IPv6 supported).
- Plays FLAC, OggFLAC, MP3 and Ogg Vorbis HTTP streams.
- Reads and caches metadata information (ID3: ID3v1 and ID3v2), Vorbis Comments, and MP4 Metadata.
- Metadata information can be searched.
- Buffer support for playback (prevents skipping due to high load or network latency).
- Gapless playback.
- Crossfading support.
- Seeking support.
- Save, load, and manage playlists (in M3U format).
- Native Zeroconf support.
- libsamplerate and native sample rate conversion.
- Support for ALSA, PulseAudio, PipeWire, OSS, MVP, JACK, Windows, and macOS.
- Can be used as a source for an Icecast stream, in Ogg Vorbis and MP3. Other formats can be converted to Ogg/MP3 on the fly before output to the stream server.
- Built-in HTTP streaming server, capable of producing Ogg Vorbis and MP3 streams of a chosen quality on-the-fly.
- Independent of a GUI. Music will continue playing whether a front-end is open or not, and will continue playing even if the X server is killed.
- Plays music files inside compressed .zip archives.

== Clients ==
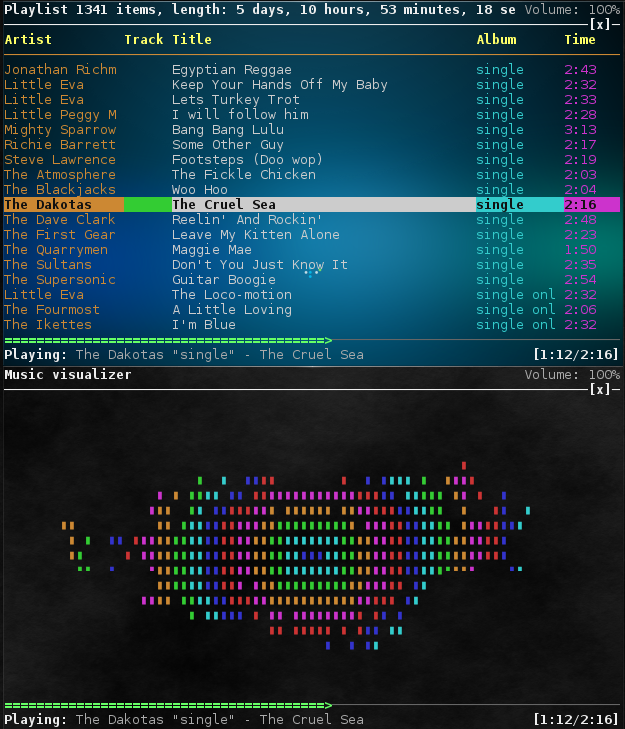
ncmpcpp

MPD has a variety of front-ends which communicate with the server using a custom protocol over a TCP connection. Clients usually implement different types of interfaces.

Simple clients can script the mpc program to issue commands to the server. Some clients provide an HTML or AJAX user interface and can be located on the same computer as the server, requiring only a browser be installed on the client machine.

== See also ==
- MusikCube
- Music on Console
