= Network-Integrated Multimedia Middleware =

Multimedia framework

The Network-Integrated Multimedia Middleware (NMM) is a flow graph based multimedia framework. NMM allows creating distributed multimedia applications: local and remote multimedia devices or software components can be controlled transparently and integrated into a common multimedia processing flow graph. NMM is implemented in C++, a programming language, and NMM-IDL, an interface description language (IDL). NMM is a set of cross-platform libraries and applications for the operating systems Linux, OS X, Windows, and others. A software development kit (SDK) is also provided.

NMM is released under dual-licensing. The Linux, OS X and PS3 versions are distributed free as open-source software under the terms and conditions of the GNU General Public License (GPL). The Windows version is distributed free as binary version under the terms and conditions of the NMM Non-Commercial License (NMM-NCL). All NMM versions (i.e., for all supported operating systems) are also distributed under a commercial license with full warranty, which allows developing closed-source proprietary software atop NMM.

== See also ==
- Java Media Framework
- DirectShow
- QuickTime
- Helix DNA
- MPlayer
- VLC media player (VLC)
- Video wall

== Sources ==
- Linux gains open source multimedia middleware
- KDE to gain cutting-edge multimedia technology
- Multimedia barriers drop at CeBIT in March
- A Survey of Software Infrastructures and Frameworks for Ubiquitous Computing
