= Rhythmbox =

Free and open source audio player

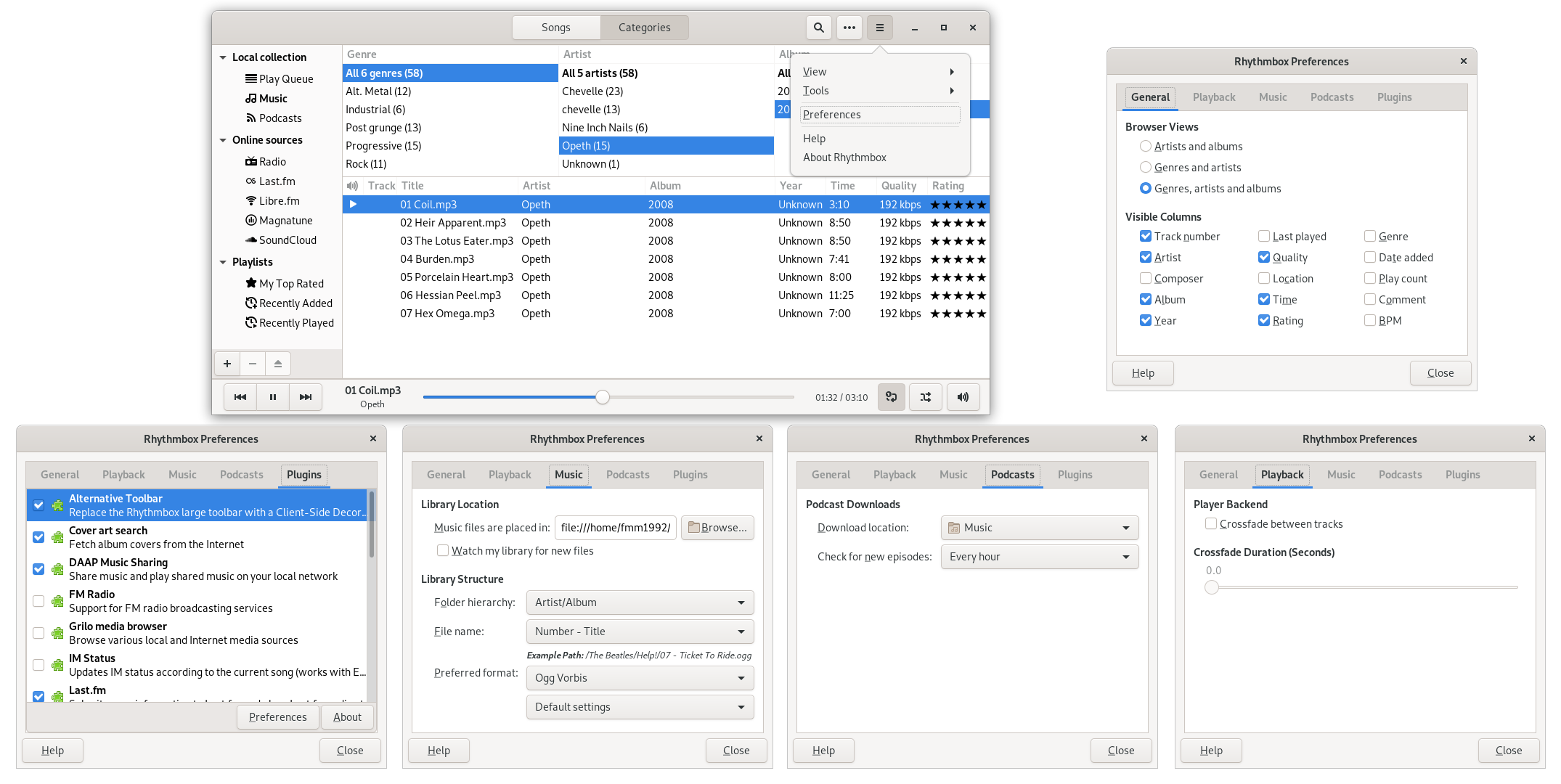
- GNOME Rhythmbox 3.4.4 with its preferences (using Alternative Toolbar plug-in)
- Developer: The GNOME Project
- Release: 18 August 2001; 25 years ago
- Stable release: 3.5.0 / 2 August 2026; 29 days ago
- Preview release: none [±]
- Written in: C (GTK)
- Operating system: Linux, Unix-like
- Available in: Multilingual
- Type: Audio player
- License: GPL-2.0-or-later
- Website: wiki.gnome.org/Apps/Rhythmbox
- Repository: gitlab.gnome.org/GNOME/rhythmbox

Rhythmbox is a free and open-source audio player software, tag editor and music organizer for digital audio files on Linux and Unix-like systems.

Rhythmbox is designed for use with GNOME, but can also function on other desktop environments. It is designed to handle large libraries of music and provides support for Unicode and plug-ins.

Rhythmbox is the default audio player on many Linux distributions including Fedora, Ubuntu since v12.04 LTS, and Linux Mint as of version 18.1.

== Features ==
=== Music playback ===
Playback from a variety of digital music sources is supported. The most common playback is music stored locally as files on the computer (the 'Library'). Rhythmbox supports playing streamed Internet radio and podcasts as well. The ReplayGain standard is also supported. Rhythmbox also supports searching of music in the library.

Playlists may be created to group and order music. Users may also create 'smart playlists,' ones that are automatically updated (like a database query) based on a customized rule of selection criteria rather than an arbitrary list of tracks. Music may be played back in shuffle (random) mode or repeat mode.

Track ratings are supported and used by the shuffle mode algorithm to play higher-rated tracks more often.

=== Music importing ===
- Audio CD ripping
- Audio format support through GStreamer
- iPod support
- Android support

=== Audio CD burning ===
Since the 0.9 release, Rhythmbox can create audio CDs from playlists.

=== Album cover display ===
Since the 0.9.5 release, Rhythmbox can display cover art of the currently playing album. The plugin can search the internet to find corresponding artwork, and as of 0.12.6, can read artwork from ID3 tags. If an image file is saved in the same directory as the audio track this is used instead.

=== SoundCloud ===
Rhythmbox can browse and play sounds from SoundCloud, via built-in SoundCloud plugin.

=== Audio scrobbling ===
Rhythmbox can submit played songs info to a remote scrobbling service. This information is used by the remote service to provide user specific music recommendations. Rhythmbox currently supports three scrobbling services:

- Last.fm
- Libre.fm, the open-source drop-in replacement
- ListenBrainz

Music can be scrobbled to all services at the same time.

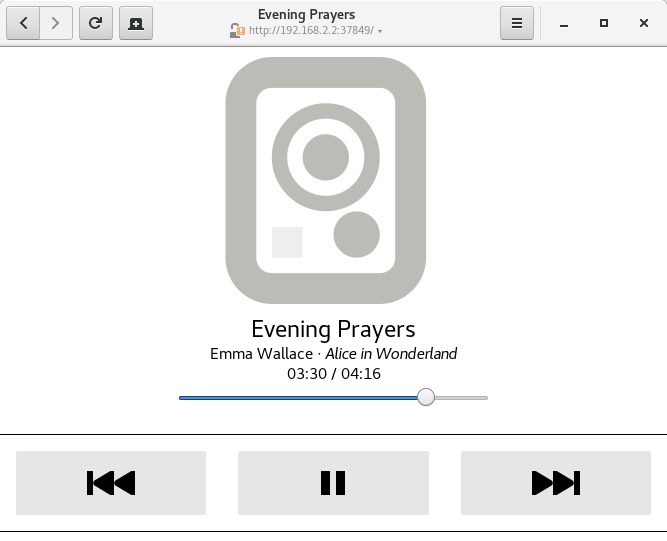
Control remote rhythmbox via GNOME web browser

=== DAAP music sharing ===
Rhythmbox supports sharing music and playing shared music on local network via DAAP sharing plugin. The plugin uses libdmapsharing to provide this feature.

=== Devices ===
Rhythmbox uses the Linux udev subsystem to detect player devices.

=== Podcasting ===
Rhythmbox can subscribe to podcasts from the iTunes Store, Miroguide or by manually providing a podcast feed URL. Subsequently, new podcasts are automatically downloaded and available from the Library under the section Podcasts.

=== Web remote control ===
Rhythmbox can be controlled remotely with a Web browser, via inbuilt Web remote control plugin.

== Plug-ins ==
Rhythmbox has a plug-in API for C, Python, or Vala.

There are nearly 50 third party plug-ins for Rhythmbox. including a 10 Band audio Equalizer, and many official plug-ins including:

- Cover art search
- Audio CD Player
- Last.fm / Libre.fm / Listenbrainz
- DAAP Music Sharing
- FM Radio
- Grilo media browser
- IM Status
- Internet Radio Streaming
- Song Lyrics
- Magnatune Store
- Media Player Keys
- Portable Players (generic, iPod)
- Android devices (via MTP)
- Notification
- Power Manager
- Python Console (for debugging)
- LIRC
- Send tracks
- Replay Gain
- MediaServer2 D-Bus interface
- MPRIS D-Bus interface
- Browser to integrate Rhythmbox with iTunes
- CD/DVD burning based on Brasero

== Integration ==
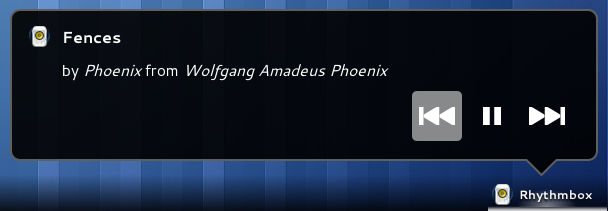
Rhythmbox displaying a pop-up notification from the GNOME notification area

Rhythmbox has been extensively integrated with a number of external programs, services and devices including:

- Built-in support for Multimedia Keys on keyboard
- Nautilus file manager context-menu integration, "hover mode" playback in Nautilus
- HexChat, via a HexChat plugin.
- Pidgin-Rhythmbox automatically updates the Pidgin user profile with details of the currently playing track
- Gajim and Pidgin include options for automatically updating the user status with details of currently playing track
- aMSN and emesene can change the user's personal message to current track via the "music" plugin (aMSN) and the "CurrentSong" plugin (emsene), similar to Messenger Plus! Live
- Music Applet (previously known as the Rhythmbox Applet), a GNOME panel applet that provides Rhythmbox playback controls from within the panel. Music Applet has since been superseded by Panflute
- Rhythmlet, another gDesklet that retrieves album art locally or from Amazon.com, has configurable display strings, playback controls, editable ratings and a seek bar
- SideCandyRhythmbox, a gDesklet-based Rhythmbox control and SideCandy display
- Rhythmbox XSLT allows the music library to be viewed as a web page
- Drivel inserts the name of the track Rhythmbox is currently playing into a LiveJournal blog entry
- Rhythmbox Tune Publisher publishes the currently playing Rhythmbox track to XMPP via the User Tune protocol (used by the Jabber World Map)
- FoxyTunes, a Mozilla Firefox extension that provides Rhythmbox playback controls from within the web browser
- Plugins for browsing and listening to Creative Commons licensed albums from Jamendo (via grilo plugin) and Magnatune.
- Rhythmbox Remote helps to remotely control Rhythmbox through an Android powered device.
- Rhythmbox WebMenu is a fully personalizable plugin that integrates Rhythmbox with several music websites.

== See also ==
- Software audio players (free and open-source)
- List of feed aggregators
- Comparison of feed aggregators
