= Sonique (media player) =

Audio player for Microsoft Windows

- Sonique's default skin
- Developer: Lycos
- Final release: 1.96 / March 2002; 24 years ago
- Operating system: Microsoft Windows
- Type: Audio player
- License: Freeware
- Website: sonique.lycos.com (Archived)

Sonique is an audio player for Microsoft Windows. Released as freeware, Sonique is capable of handling MP3, Ogg Vorbis, Windows Media Audio (WMA), Music tracker modules, and audio CDs. Sonique was in development until 2002. It was one of the most popular desktop audio players, second only to Winamp. The major features of Sonique include support for irregular skins, the audioEnlightenment MP3 decoding engine by Tony Million, innovative audio visualizations, and a 20 band graphic equalizer.

== History ==
Sonique had roots in the lesser known Vibe MP3 player that Andrew McCann, Ian Lyman and Paul Peavyhouse created while studying at Montana State University. The trio called themselves Night55, a reference to the speed limit signs used in Montana. In 1997, Night55 sold the rights to Vibe to SGS Thompson for showcasing DVD features in COMDEX '98. After selling the rights to Vibe, Andrew McCann and Ian Lyman began work on Sonique, a more comprehensive MP3 player.

Sonique debuted in January 1998. Shortly after the MP3 Summit, Lyman and McCann returned to their hometown of Bozeman, Montana and formed Mediascience, Inc. They leased office space in a former coffee shop and hired additional staff to sustain their burgeoning user base. After talks with both Yahoo and Lycos, in 1999, Mediascience was sold to Lycos for US$38.8 million. Terra Networks, S.A. acquired Lycos in mid-2001.

Shortly after the acquisition, the Sonique team began work on Sonique 2, intended to become a platform for listening to, organizing and purchasing digital music. This version, however, never reached general availability. Following the collapse of the dot-com bubble, Lycos laid off the entire Sonique team with the exception of McCann and Lyman. Unhappy with the summary termination of their colleagues, McCann and Lyman left shortly thereafter. A smaller team from Lycos corporate headquarters took over their job but never completed it.

== Design ==
Sonique features a highly stylized aesthetic with an animated menu, which could be customized via skins. Additional functionality includes a basic playlist editor, several visualization modes via plug-ins, a 20-band equalizer with spline-based level adjustment, and a control set featuring pitch, balance and amplification adjustment. It supported MP3, MP2, Ogg Vorbis, WAV, MOD, XM, IT, S3M, Audio CD and Windows Media Audio formats. Third-party plug-ins can add other audio formats and music visualization effect. Sonique can also play to audio streams.

Sonique comes bundled with a test MP3 file featuring a song snippet by Mamasutra, entitled "Sonique Theme." The comment field in the file metadata reads, "Its so good, so good, so good," mirroring part of the lyrics.

== See also ==
- Comparison of audio player software
