= MusicBee =

Media player for Microsoft Windows

- MusicBee 3.4.7628 running on Windows 10
- Developer: Steven Mayall
- Release: December 4, 2008; 17 years ago
- Stable release: 3.7.9796 / October 29, 2026; 2 days ago
- Written in: VB.NET
- Operating system: Windows 7 or later
- Size: 8.9 MB
- Available in: 15 languages
- List of languages Chinese Simplified, Dutch, English (UK, US), French, German, Greek, Italian, Japanese, Polish, Portuguese (BR, PT), Russian, Spanish, Swedish
- Type: Media player
- License: Freeware
- Website: getmusicbee.com

MusicBee is a freeware media player for playback and organization of audio files on Microsoft Windows, built using the BASS audio library.

== Reception ==
In a 2017 review, Windows Central praised MusicBee for its number of features and customisability.

== See also ==
- Comparison of audio player software
