= APE tag =

Metadata container

APE tags comprise one extant convention used to store information (metadata) about a given digital audio file. Each APE tag constitutes a discrete element that describes a single attribute of the file's contents. Each consists of a key/value pair; the key is simply a label that names the attribute, such as Year, Title, Artist, or Track Number, etc.), and associated with it is a corresponding value, namely, some information descriptive of this file, in terms of the attribute in question (e.g., 1973 for Year). APE tags can be used with .ape-formatted recordings, as well as with sound files of other audio file formats.

== Essence ==
A sound file, such as an .ape- or .mp3-formatted file, may, in addition to its payload audio data, also contain metadata that provide descriptive or statistical information about its audio content. When APE (v1) tags are used, they will appear at the end of the file, following the data; i.e., the digitized audio stream. Placing the tags at the end of the file, rather than at the beginning, can make expansion of the metadata simpler for programmers to code, but may add more wait time to the user experience for file loading and processing. APE field names ("keys") are character strings for which no rigid standard exists, nor is there a set list of keys nor of their allowable values.

== Features ==
APE tags are more similar to Vorbis comments than ID3 tags. Like Vorbis comments, they are unstructured (key, value) pairs. However, unlike Vorbis comments, they do not allow for inter-key ordering. This is because they store a list of values for each key rather than one value per key.

APE values can be flagged as text, binary, or external types. This allows tag editing software to avoid incorrectly displaying binary values, such as an image of album cover art, in the form of unreadable text to users. In comparison, Vorbis comments do not have a flagging feature, so binary data cannot be easily stored in them (though this is by design).

APEv2 supports Unicode using UTF-8 for values. For keys, an ASCII subset (control characters from 0x00 to 0x1f are not allowed) must be used.

== Versions ==
=== APEv1 ===
The APEv1 tag was designed for the Monkey's Audio format. In MP3 files, the APE tag is stored at the very end of the file, with no inline declaration in the body of the file. The software handles the writing and access to the tag and does not interfere with the contents of the MP3.

=== APEv2 ===
The Musepack format developer, Frank Klemm, extended the original APE tag format to add a header, allowing APE tags to be at the beginning of files and allowing metadata values to be Unicode rather than simply ASCII. Because of its simplicity and flexibility, APEv2 was adopted by the WavPack and OptimFROG formats as their primary tag format. Version 3.99 of the official Monkey's Audio software switched from using APEv1 to APEv2.

Media players such as Winamp, foobar2000, MusicBee support reading and writing of APEv2 tags in MP3 files. The tagging string APETAGEX signals the start of an APEv2 record, and the string TAG signals the start of an ID3v1 tag.

Here is an example of APEv2 tags as used by a WavPack format file taken from Piano Opera FINAL FANTASY VII / VIII / IX by Nobuo Uematsu:

Album:             Piano Opera FINAL FANTASY VII / VIII / IX 
Album Artist:      植松伸夫 
Albumartistsort:   Uematsu, Nobuo 
Artist:            植松伸夫 
Artists:           植松伸夫 
Artistsort:        Uematsu, Nobuo 
Barcode:           4988601463935 
CatalogNumber:     SQEX-10432 
Composer:          植松伸夫 
Disc:              1/1 
Genre:             Classical 
Label:             SQUARE ENIX 
Media:             CD 
Musicbrainz_Albumartistid: 92bb085a-2924-4479-b627-181a1835d2f5\836efab3-fb2c-45fc-afac-10d0598cfbba 
Musicbrainz_Albumid: 22d24613-8c3b-461d-ae3d-fd7b9786581c 
MUSICBRAINZ_ALBUMSTATUS: official 
MUSICBRAINZ_ALBUMTYPE: album 
Musicbrainz_Artistid: 92bb085a-2924-4479-b627-181a1835d2f5 
Musicbrainz_Releasegroupid: 653cc2ee-301c-46de-86df-deb7623a37e8 
musicbrainz_releasetrackid: 3031e37b-f395-4903-9a13-1c031d636e59 
musicbrainz_trackid: ed485087-e253-43d2-a503-105e857ed046 
Originaldate:      2014-04-23 
Originalyear:      2014 
Performer:         中山 博之 
Releasecountry:    JP 
REPLAYGAIN_ALBUM_GAIN: -5.56 dB 
REPLAYGAIN_ALBUM_PEAK: 1.000000 
REPLAYGAIN_TRACK_GAIN: -6.42 dB 
REPLAYGAIN_TRACK_PEAK: 1.000000 
Script:            Jpan 
Title:             オープニング〜爆破ミッション [FINAL FANTASY VII] 
Tool Name:         fre:ac 
Tool Version:      v1.1.7 
Track:             11/12 
Year:              2014-04-23 
Cover Art (Front): 37684-byte binary item (jpg)

== See also ==
- Tag editor
- puddletag
