= Monkey's Audio =

Open-source lossless audio codec

- Filename extension: .ape
- Standard: www.monkeysaudio.com/developers.html
- Open format?: Yes
- Free format?: Yes

Monkey's Audio
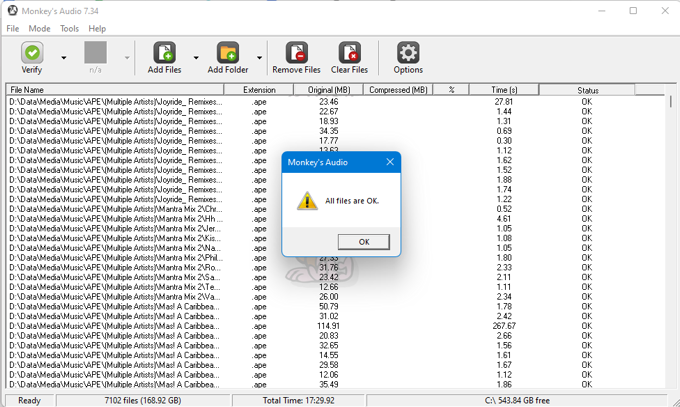
- Screenshot of Monkey's Audio software on Windows successfully verifying .ape files
- Developer: Matthew T. Ashland
- Release: 2000; 26 years ago
- Stable release: 11.81 / 5 November 2025
- Type: Audio compression
- License: The 3-Clause BSD Licence
- Website: www.monkeysaudio.com

Monkey's Audio is an algorithm and file format for lossless audio data compression. Lossless data compression does not discard data during the process of encoding, unlike lossy compression methods such as AAC, MP3, Vorbis, and Opus. Similar to other lossless audio codecs, files encoded to Monkey's Audio are typically reduced to about half of the original size, with data transfer time and storage requirements being reduced accordingly.

== Comparisons ==
Like any lossless compression scheme, Monkey's Audio format takes up several times as much space as lossy compression formats - typically, about twice as much as a 320 kbit/s bitrate MP3 file. The upside is that no data is lost compared to the input file, making lossless codecs suitable for transcoding, or simply taking up approximately half as much space as raw PCM data.

Relative to FLAC, Apple Lossless Audio Codec, or WavPack, Monkey's Audio is slow to encode or decode files.

While Monkey's Audio can achieve high compression ratios, the cost is a dramatic increase in requirements on the decoding end. Many older portable media players, and even older smartphones, have difficulty handling this. In comparison, most lossless codecs are asymmetric, meaning that the work done to achieve higher compression ratios, if selected by the user, slows down the encoding process, but has essentially no effect on the decoding requirements.

== Licensing ==
On 10 August 2023, with the release of version 10.18, Monkey's Audio switched to the Open Source Initiative-approved 3-Clause BSD Licence.

Other lossless codecs such as FLAC and WavPack are also available under open source licences, and are well supported in Linux distributions and in many applications. Since all of these formats are lossless, users can transcode between formats without generation loss.

== Technical details ==
Monkey's Audio first converts stereo signals into standard mid and difference channels, similar to other codecs. The X (mid or average channel) is calculated by taking the mean of the left and right channels, and the Y (side or difference channel) is calculated by subtracting the right from the left channel. This is a reversible transform that the decoder will later apply as well.

Monkey's Audio supports linear prediction, using a novel fixed first-order predictor followed by several adaptive offset filters, as well as neural network-based predictors with up to a 1024 sample window. The residuals (errors) are then encoded using range coding.

Monkey's Audio frames support a form of CRC-32 (with the MSB truncated) for error detection. The entire file also has its MD5 hash computed and stored. The reference decoder verifies the file hash, and locates errors, if present, by considering each frame's CRC checksum. While the format supports error detection, it cannot correct errors if they are present.

== Supported platforms ==
Officially, Monkey's Audio is available for the Microsoft Windows platform. As of version 4.02 (19 January 2009) a DirectShow filter is distributed with the installer, allowing for compatibility with most media players running on the Windows operating system.

Monkey's Audio is also supported on Linux and OS X using JRiver Media Center or Plex. A Linux port of the command line tool mac is also available.

A GPL-licensed version of the Monkey's Audio decoder has been independently written for Rockbox and is included in FFmpeg. This code also provides playback support in applications that use GStreamer, as well as DeaDBeeF.

A number of Mac OS X players and rippers support the format as well. It is also available as a port and package on FreeBSD.

Monkey's Audio files can be encoded and decoded on any platform which has a J2SE implementation, by the means of the unofficial JMAC library, which is free software licensed under the GNU LGPL.

=== Hardware support ===
Monkey's Audio is supported natively on all modern Cowon multimedia media players, the FiiO X Series and some Cayin digital audio players.

On other hardware platforms, the open source firmware project Rockbox supports playback of Monkey's Audio files on most of its supported targets, but many lack sufficient processing power to play them on the higher compression settings.

== See also ==
- Comparison of audio formats
- FLAC
- WavPack
- Apple Lossless
- MPEG-4 ALS
- Meridian Lossless Packing
- APE tag
