= Coalizione del Volere =

Studio album by The Seldon Plan
- Released: January 12, 2011
- Recorded: November 2011–December 2011
- Genre: Indie pop, alternative rock
- Length: 23:34
- Label: Magnatune and The Beechfields Record Label
- Producer: Frank Marchand and The Seldon Plan

The Seldon Plan chronology
Lost and Found and Lost (2009)	Coalizione del Volere (2011)	That Time You Dreamed EP (2013)

Coalizione del Volere is a record from The Seldon Plan. The album was released in 2011 on both Magnatune and The Beechfields Record Label. The Beechfields Records version was released as a limited edition translucent red 12" record with additional bonus tracks in 2012.The album features Michael Nestor on vocals and guitars, David Hirner on Bass, Chris Ehrich on guitars, and Frank Corl on Percussion. The record was produced by Frank Marchand and is the final full-length record by The Seldon Plan.

== Reception ==
The Big Takeover highlighted the record as continuing the "...Baltimore foursome's continued maturation." Coalizione del Volere has been compared to albums by The Promise Ring and American football. Independent Clauses writes, "The Seldon Plan trusts its listeners to be like they are: older, well-versed, appreciative of the little things without being told to be so." Babysue writes that, "Coalizione del Volere may just be the band's strongest disc yet." And says, "They just keep getting better over time." The record made it to a number of music blog top 50 lists, was called a "...beautiful indie pop treasure", and was compared positively to The Feelies.

== Track listing ==
1. "Fractionation" - 03:36
2. "Fool's Gold" - 03:16
3. "Starlette Pendant" - 02:34
4. "Love Your Way" - 03:04
5. "The Sun, The Sea" - 01:49
6. "Our Time In Rockland County" - 02:38
7. "Millennials" - 02:58
8. "A Letter To Satie" - 03:39
