= The Collective Now =

Studio album by The Seldon Plan
- Released: September 2007
- Recorded: March–April, 2007
- Genre: Indie rock Pop; Alternative rock
- Length: 32:25
- Label: Magnatune and The Beechfields Record Label
- Producer: Frank Marchand and The Seldon Plan

The Seldon Plan chronology
Making Circles (2005)	The Collective Now (2007)	Lost and Found and Lost (2009)

Professional ratings
Review scores
Source	Rating
AllMusic	4/5 stars

The Collective Now is an album released in September 2007 by The Seldon Plan. It is their second album, following on from their 2005 debut album, Making Circles. It is produced by Frank Marchand, and features vocals and guitar by Michael Nestor and Bobby Landle, and drums and percussion by Mike Landavere.

== The album ==
The album is described as having eleven "highly melodic, totally tuneful songs buttressed by rushing, bright electric guitars". It is produced by Frank Marchand with vocals and guitar by Michael Nestor and Bobby Landle, drums and percussion by Mike Landavere and mastering by Charlie Pilzer. Its genre is pop/rock and the total duration is 34:25 minutes.

== Track listing ==
1. "Going Nowhere Slow" - 3:20
2. "Colored Lenses" - 3:43
3. "This Bedroom Prayer" - 3:02
4. "Modern Vigil" - 2:21
5. "Poem for the Middle Class" - 3:17
6. "Seraphim" - 3:31
7. "Brandywine Situation" - 3:22
8. "Saint Barnabas" - 3:53
9. "Dance, Despite the Obvious" - 3:38
10. "All the Real Girls" - 2:43
11. "Oella" - 1:35
