= Lost and Found and Lost =

Studio album by The Seldon Plan
- Released: June 2009
- Recorded: December 2008–April 2009
- Genre: Indie pop Alternative rock
- Length: 30:15
- Label: Magnatune and The Beechfields Record Label
- Producer: Matthew Leffler Schulman and The Seldon Plan

The Seldon Plan chronology
| The Collective Now (2007) | Lost and Found and Lost (2009) |

Professional ratings
Review scores
| Source | Rating |
|---|---|
| The Big Takeover | 5/5 stars |

Lost and Found and Lost is a studio album released in June 2009 by The Seldon Plan. It is their third album, following on from their 2005 album Making Circles and their 2007 album The Collective Now. It is produced by Mat Leffler-Schulman, and features vocals and guitar by Michael Nestor. It is released under The Beechfields Record Label

== The album ==
The vocals are written and sung by Michael Nestor, who also plays the guitar and keyboards. Dawn Dineen also performs vocals and is part of the choir, which also includes Ellen Cherry, Chris Ehrich and Mike Pursley. The album is released under the Beechfields Record Label. The Seldon Plan come from Maryland, USA but are now based in Baltimore. Michael Nestor described the lyrics as "the hardest ... I've ever had to write". The album has been described as "Whimsical, nostalgic indie pop, tells the story of expectant hope and recession blues".

== Track listing ==
1. "Caldecott" – 2:18
2. "Fire in Day's Field" – 2:53
3. "Lost and Found and Lost" – 2:50
4. "Lullabies for Old Hearts" – 2:42
5. "Run, Go!" – 2:18
6. "Philadelphia and a Moment" – 3:14
7. "French Cinema" – 3:02
8. "Lonely Bridgewater" – 4:11
9. "See a Word" – 2:30
10. "There Are Definite Undertones Here" – 4:17
11. "Majestic Mountain" – 1:56
12. "Ezra Jack Keats" – 4:07
