= Digital Audio Access Protocol =

For sharing music in Apple's iTunes

The Digital Audio Access Protocol (DAAP) is the proprietary protocol introduced by Apple in its iTunes software to share media across a local network.

DAAP addresses the same problems for Apple as the UPnP AV standards address for members of the Digital Living Network Alliance (DLNA).

== Description ==
The DAAP protocol was originally introduced in iTunes version 4.0. Initially, Apple did not officially release a protocol description, but it has been reverse-engineered to a sufficient degree that reimplementations of the protocol for non-iTunes platforms have been possible.

A DAAP server is a specialized HTTP server, which performs two functions. It sends a list of songs and it streams requested songs to clients. There are also provisions to notify the client of changes to the server. Requests are sent to the server by the client in form of URLs and are responded to with data in application/x-dmap-tagged mime-type, which can be converted to XML by the client. iTunes uses the zeroconf (also known as Bonjour) service to announce and discover DAAP shares on a local subnet. The DAAP service uses TCP port 3689 by default.

DAAP is one of two media sharing schemes that Apple has currently released. The other, Digital Photo Access Protocol (DPAP), is used by iPhoto for sharing images. They both rely on an underlying protocol, Digital Media Access Protocol (DMAP).

Early versions of iTunes allowed users to connect to shares across the Internet, however, in recent versions only computers on the same subnet can share music (workarounds such as port tunneling are possible). The Register speculates that Apple made this move in response to pressure from the record labels. More recent versions of iTunes also limit the number of clients to 5 unique IP addresses within a 24-hour period.

DAAP has also been implemented in other non-iTunes media applications such as Banshee, Amarok, Exaile (with a plugin), Songbird (with a plugin), Rhythmbox, and WiFiTunes.

== DAAP authentication ==
Beginning with iTunes 4.2, Apple introduced authentication to DAAP sharing, meaning that the only clients that could connect to iTunes servers were other instances of iTunes. This was further modified in iTunes 4.5 to use a custom hashing algorithm, rather than the standard MD5 function used previously. Both authentication methods were successfully reverse engineered within months of release.

With iTunes 7.0, a new 'Client-DAAP-Validation' header hash is needed when connecting to an iTunes 7.0 server. This does not affect third-party DAAP servers, and all DAAP clients without support for this feature, including iTunes itself before version 7.0, will fail to connect to an iTunes 7.0 server, receiving a '403 Forbidden' HTTP error. The iTunes 7.0 authentication traffic analysis seem to indicate that a certificate exchange is performed to calculate the hash sent in the 'Client-DAAP-Validation' header.

== DAAP clients ==
Name	Platform: Desktop	Platform: Portable	Platform: Devices/Other	Platform: TVs	Development status
iOS Music app (formerly iPod app)		iOS (by setting: password on Settings, then More>Shared), since iOS 4.3			Native
Amarok	Windows, Mac, Linux				Active
Banshee	Windows, Mac, Linux				Active
Crossfire			Cross-platform Ajax-based Firefly client, with multiple browser support Safari (inc. iOS), Nokia, Opera, IE, Chrome		Active
DAAP Client		Android			Dormant
DAAP Media Player		Android			Active
Diapente		Android			Dormant
FireflyClient			Independent (uses Java)		Dormant
Get it together			Any Java supported platform		Dormant
iTunes	Windows, Mac	iOS	Apple TV		Native
LimeWire	Windows, Mac, Linux				Active
One2OhMyGod			Any Java supported platform		Dormant
Rhythmbox	Linux				Active
Roku Soundbridge and Radio			Roku		Dormant
WiFiTunes		PocketPC			Dormant
Songbird	Windows, Mac, Linux (unsupported)				Dormant, via plugin for 1.8.0
SoundBox	Windows, Mac				Active
Silverplay			Only Silverlight required		Active
Simple DAAP Client		iOS			Dormant
Winamp with ml_daap plugin	Windows				Winamp discontinued on 12/20/2013; ml_daap dormant, depends on Apple Bonjour support for Windows
XBMC	Windows, Mac, Linux	XBMC Live iPad	Apple TV (2nd generation) only, and some others		Active

== DAAP servers ==
Name	Operating system				Development status
Name	Linux	macOS	Microsoft Windows	Other	Development status
iTunes	No	No	Yes	No	Active
Apple Music	No	Yes	No	No	Active
OwnTone	Yes	No	No	FreeBSD	Active
Firefly Media Server (mt-daapd)	Yes	Yes	Yes	FreeBSD	Dormant
Tangerine	Yes	Yes	Yes	FreeBSD	Dormant
spydaap DAAP server (python)	Yes	Yes	Yes	FreeBSD	Dormant
FreeNAS and NAS4Free	No	No	No	FreeBSD	Active
NASLite M2	Yes	No	No	No	Active
OpenMediaVault	Yes	No	No	No	Active
Ampache	Yes	Yes	Yes	FreeBSD	Active
Rhythmbox	Yes	No	No	No	Active
node-daapd	Yes	No	No	No	Dormant
Wild Media Server (UPnP, DLNA, HTTP)	Yes	Yes	Yes	No	Active
canary	Yes	Yes	No	No	Active
dmapd	Yes	No	No	No	Active

== See also ==
- Digital Audio Control Protocol
- Remote Audio Output Protocol
