= DMAP =

DMAP may refer to:

- Digital Media Access Protocol, a family of proprietary protocols by Apple
- 4-Dimethylaminopyridine (CH_{3})_{2}NC_{5}H_{4}N), a derivative of pyridine
- 4-Dimethylaminophenol (C_{8}H_{11}NO), an aromatic compound containing both phenol and amine functional groups
- Data Management Advisory Panel, of the England school census

== See also ==
- Dimethylallylpyrophosphate (DMAPP)
- Digital Mass Atrocity Prevention Lab, of the Montreal Institute for Genocide and Human Rights Studies
