= Moodbar =

Computer visualization

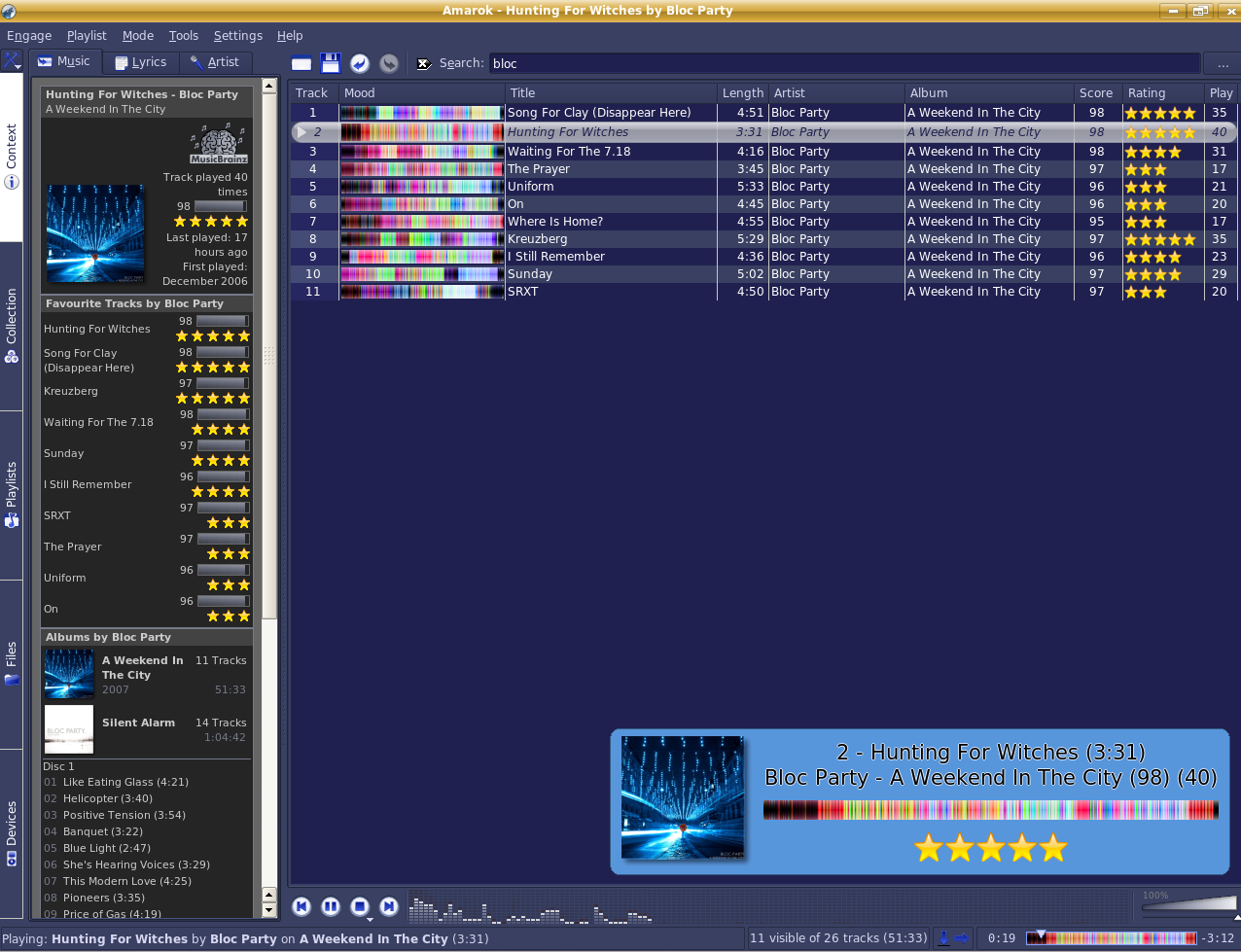
- Amarok 1.4.5 with Moodbar functionality
- License: GPL
- Repository: github.com/exaile/moodbar/

A moodbar is a music visualization for a recording on a digital audio track. It is commonly shown as a horizontal bar, divided into vertical stripes. The stripes follow a preset colour scale, representing the classified "mood" of a moment within the audio. Colours are assigned based on spectral and rhythmic features. It was designed to assist with navigation within audio tracks. It is also useful for comparing different tracks, for example: songs with quiet sections display with gaps, slow buildups show a gradual increase in colour, and louder songs are mostly filled in.

If the audio is music, the song's structure (intro, choruses, solos, accents, etc.) and changes (dynamics, rhythm, texture, instruments) will show as distinct regions or different colours. If the audio is a speech or interview, different speaking segments show as unique colour combinations.

The concept of a moodbar was first presented in 2005 by computer scientists Gavin Wood and Simon O’Keefe in their paper On Techniques for Content-Based Visual Annotation to Aid Intra-Track Music Navigation.

The moodbar feature has been implemented in the free and open-source desktop audio players Amarok, Clementine (and its fork Strawberry), and Exaile, as well as in the GJay smart playlist creator for Linux.

As of 2008, the default implementation of Amarok's moodbar uses only the spectral content of the current section of the track. It calculates the energy in the low, medium, and high frequency bands, and displays this as a combination of red, green, and blue in the corresponding stripe. Each moodbar file is 1000 samples long, which corresponds to roughly 4–5 samples every second over a typical 3–4 minute song. This is not useful in determining the rhythm of a song, but it is sometimes possible to guess which instruments are playing, based on similar colours. This can be useful for spotting verse, chorus, verse structure, and breaks in the music.

== See also ==
- Music Genome Project
- Acoustic fingerprint
