= DACP =

- Department of the Army Civilian Police
- Digital Audio Control Protocol
