= SoundBridge =

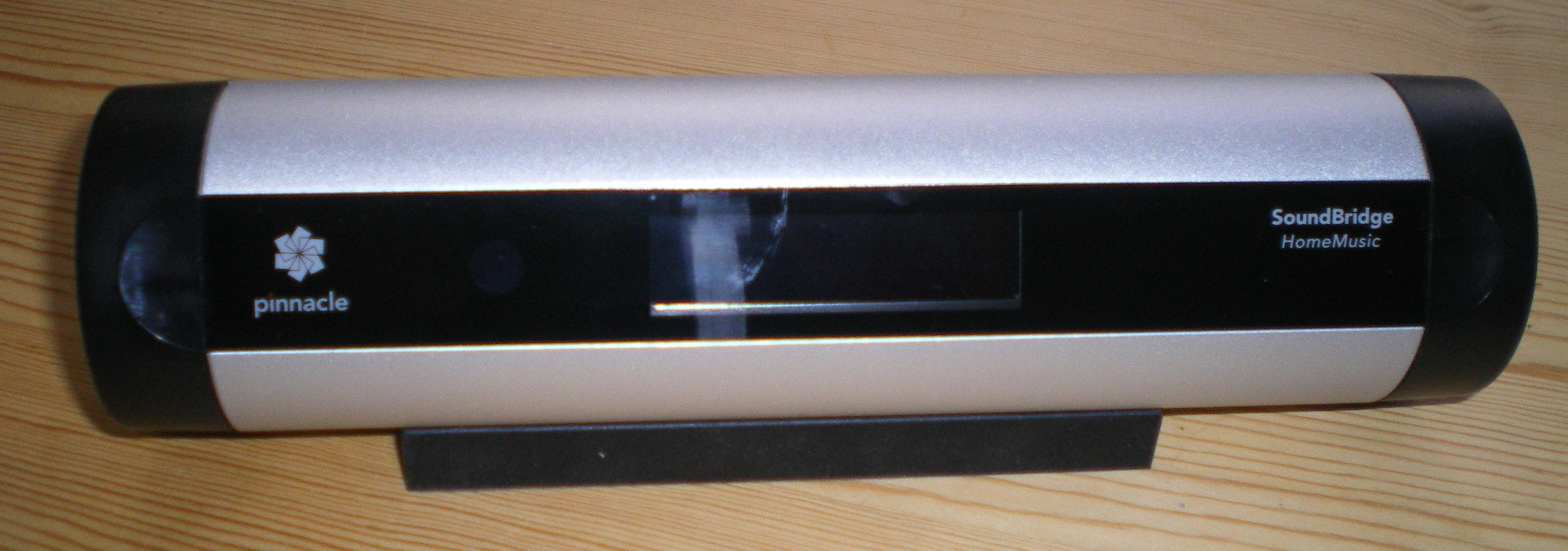
A SoundBridge Homemusic

SoundBridge is a hardware device from Roku, Inc. designed to play internet radio or digital audio streamed across a home network, over either Wi-Fi or ethernet. SoundBridge devices directly browsed the Radio Roku guide. As of 2008, all Roku SoundBridge products were discontinued; Roku focused on IPTV. As of January 2012, the SoundBridge was no longer available from Roku. As of May 2018, internet radio functionality was no longer supported by Roku; they shut down their Radio Roku server that provided searching, saving, and accessing "Favorite" stations. However, the Roku SoundBridge can still access radio streams stored in its 18 URL presets.

The music is also made available by a streaming server, usually a PC running media software. The SoundBridge had a high-resolution vacuum fluorescent display and was compatible with various media servers, namely servers using Apple's Digital Audio Access Protocol; popular servers are iTunes, mt-daapd, Windows Media Connect, Rhapsody, SlimServer, and UPnP (Universal Plug and Play) compatible servers such as TwonkyVision. Some of these servers run not only on PCs but also on NAS devices like the Linksys NSLU2, so a SoundBridge could be operated without a PC.

== Models ==
There were several SoundBridge models: The M1000, the M500, and the M2000. There was also a tabletop model called the SoundBridge Radio that had built-in speakers, an AM/FM radio, and an alarm clock.

SoundBridge models sold in most countries were manufactured and sold by Pinnacle Systems under a license from Roku. Although some Pinnacle models were similar or identical in hardware, Pinnacle didn't have a license for the DAAP protocol, so Pinnacle models couldn't directly connect to iTunes. Pinnacle and Roku promoted the Firefly Media Server as an alternative that offers similar functionality. Pinnacle models include:

- SoundBridge (one version identical to Roku SoundBridge M1001, another known as M1001HR with the higher resolution 280×32 pixel display as used in the SoundBridge Radio)
- SoundBridge Radio (identical to Roku SoundBridge Radio sans native iTunes support)
- Soundbridge HomeMusic - M400PX (character-based LCD - 16×2 characters; no Ethernet; no digital output; SD card slot; low-cost plastic housing in place of aluminum extrusion on original models)

Those sold in the US included:

- M1001 SoundBridge (bitmapped VFD display - 280×16; similar to original M1000 model)
- R1000 SoundBridge Radio (bitmapped VFD display - 280×32; AM/FM tuner; SD card slot; built-in speakers)
- M500 SoundBridge (character-based LCD - 40×2 characters)
- M1000 SoundBridge (bitmapped VFD display - 280×16)
- M2000 SoundBridge (bitmapped VFD display - 512×32; larger, 17 in (430 mm) enclosure with very large display)

== WPA support ==
Firmware version 2.7 supported Wi-Fi Protected Access, but only for the M1001, the SoundBridge Radio, and the European versions from Pinnacle; not for the older M500/1000/2000 versions. The SoundBridge is an 802.11b device, but it can be used with backward compatible 802.11g networks.

== Open source ==
Since the appliance was abandoned by Roku, an open-source version was released using the Roku Server Protocol (RSP). The software is used in a number of Linux media players.

== See also ==
- PlaysForSure
- Firefly Media Server
- Squeezebox (network music player)
- Sonos
- Digital Living Network Alliance (DLNA)
