= Pupa's Window =

- Origin: Baltimore, Maryland, United States
- Genres: lo-fi, Indie pop, Indie rock
- Years active: 1994–2008
- Labels: The Beechfields Record Label, Seconal Records, OTP Records, Modern Hymnal Recordings

Pupa's Window is a lo-fi singer/songwriter pseudonym from Baltimore, Maryland.

== History ==
In 1994, singer/songwriter Michael Nestor formed Pupa's Window in Eldersburg, Maryland-mostly as a vehicle to document the recording process and produce lo-fi cassette recordings. In the early-to-mid 1990s, Pupa's Window recorded music at the advent of cassette-based, lo-fi indie pop. The project had some early success on college radio-typically charting in the CMJ New Music Report. After 2002, Pupa's Window records began to become more orchestrated, and involve other musicians. Shortly after joining The Beechfields Record Label in Baltimore, Maryland, Pupa's Window began to be regarded as one of the "best-kept indie-pop songwriter secrets" in Baltimore. The band's music draws comparison to Lou Barlow, Bill Callahan and Elliott Smith and has been described as, "a stripped-down, folky type of indie-pop with a freak factor provided by plenty of echoey production, a few odd instruments and sounds, and tape-loop tinkering." Between 1994 and 2008, Pupa's Window released over eighteen records on both cassette and compact disc, and collaborated with Baltimore-based artist Private Eleanor. Concurrently with this project, from 1998 to 2001, Nestor played in a shoegaze band, called Lowell. Work on both Pupa's Window and Lowell were instrumental in Nestor joining the alt-rock group The Seldon Plan. Recording as Pupa's Window contributed to The Seldon Plan's role in the Baltimore indie and DIY movement that experienced a revitalization across the late 1990s through the mid 2000s.

The lo-fi indie DIY ethos had a significant impact on Nestor and his work with Pupa's Window helped in his development of The Beechfields Record Label. In 2003, he founded The Beechfields. Nestor notes in an interview with Baltimore City Paper, the goal was to maintain an artist-centered approach to releasing records based on Virginia label Simple Machines founded by Jenny Toomey. In 2004, Baltimore musician Austin Stahl began working at The Beechfields with Nestor to develop the label's roster while playing percussion for Pupa's Window. Asked about the potential for too much emphasis on an inward-looking and diary-esque approach within lo-fi indie pop in general and Pupa's Window specifically, Nestor has said, "I'm really afraid of the self-indulgent aspect of this music...what I try to remember, is to keep things in the service of the song, that if something isn't working for the song--the lyrics, a drum loop, whatever--to rethink it."
