= Squeezebox (network music player) =

Family of network music players

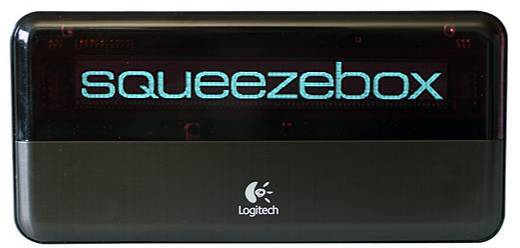
- Squeezebox 3 in Logitech housing
- Developer: Logitech
- Type: Network Music Player
- Released: 2001
- Introductory price: US$199.99 (€179.99)
- Discontinued: 2012

Squeezebox is a family of network music players. The original device was the SliMP3, introduced in 2001 by Slim Devices. It had an Ethernet interface and played MP3 music files from a media server. The first Squeezebox was released two years later and was followed by several more models. Slim Devices was acquired by Logitech in 2006.

== History ==
Slim Devices was established in 2000, and was first known for its SlimServer used for streaming music, but launched a hardware player named SliMP3 able to play these streams in 2001. Although the first player was fairly simple only supporting wired Ethernet and MP3 natively, it was followed two years later by a slightly more advanced player which was renamed to Squeezebox. Other versions followed, gradually adding native support for additional file formats, Wi-Fi-support, gradually adding larger and more advanced displays as well as a version targeting audiophile users. Support for playing music from external streaming platforms such as Pandora, Napster, Last.fm and Sirius were also added. The devices in general have two operating modes; either standalone where the device connects to an internet streaming service directly, or to a local computer running the Logitech Media Server or a network-attached storage device. Both the server software and large parts of the firmware on the most recent players are released under open source licenses.

In 2006, Slim Devices was acquired by Logitech for US$20 million. Logitech continued the development of their hardware players until they announced in August 2012 that they would be discontinued. The online service mysqueezebox.com, needed to use a Squeezebox without a private server, was still being maintained by Logitech. Given the cross-platform nature of the server and software client, some users have ensured the continued use of the platform by utilizing the Raspberry Pi as dedicated Squeezebox device (both client and server).

In January 2024 Logitech announced that they will close down their online server at mysqueezebox.com in February 2024. After that, the only way to use your Squeezebox device will be through a local Squeezebox server, called Lyrion Music Server. Open Source code for such a server can be found here.

== Squeezebox versions ==
=== SliMP3 (2001) ===
The first-generation hardware requires Logitech Media Server (formerly SlimServer, SqueezeCenter and Squeezebox Server), to run, which is free, open source software. It is wired-Ethernet only and natively supports one audio format, MP3. Logitech Media Server can transcode other audio formats to MP3 on the fly, using the LAME MP3 encoder.

=== Squeezebox (November 2003) ===
Second generation hardware, also called SB1 to avoid confusing it with the Squeezebox product range. The SB1 originally used the same display as the SliMP3. Main feature additions included optional 802.11b Wi-Fi, support for uncompressed PCM/WAV/AIFF audio streams, and headphone, coaxial and optical S/PDIF outputs. As with successor models, the required server may be SlimServer (ended with Rev 6.5.4), SqueezeCenter (Rev 7.x) or the Logitech Media Server. Slim Devices offered a bitmap display upgrade for this hardware, but that is no longer available. Some units have a 40×2 Noritake character display, others have a 280×16 pixel Noritake bitmap display.

=== Squeezebox2 (April 2005) ===
Third generation hardware. Features included optional 802.11g Wi-Fi, native support for more audio formats (FLAC, WMA, Ogg), upgraded 320×32 pixel greyscale bitmap VFD display, visualizers, bitmapped fonts.

This model has infrared remote control, analog outputs, volume control, headphone jack, coaxial and optical digital outputs.

The Squeezebox2 supports numerous audio formats including MP3, Windows Media Audio, Musepack, Monkey's Audio, Apple Lossless, FLAC, Shorten, WAV, AIFF, Ogg Vorbis, and unencrypted AAC. Of these, MP3, Windows Media, FLAC, WAV, AIFF and Ogg Vorbis are natively supported by the player firmware; the remainder are automatically transcoded by the Logitech Media Server host software into one of the player-supported formats. DRM-crippled AAC from the Apple iTunes Music Store is not supported.

=== Squeezebox Classic (SB3) (November 2005) ===
The Squeezebox Classic, aka Squeezebox3, SB3 and Squeezebox 3rd Generation, has the fourth generation hardware. The features and most of the technical specifications are identical to that of the Squeezebox2. A new board and chassis design are used, as well as a new remote and internal Wi-Fi antennas. With the introduction of the "Duet" Squeezebox3 was renamed "Squeezebox Classic".

Because of the transition to Logitech during production, the SB3 was available in a Slim Devices and a Logitech housing.

Dimensions: 7.6"W × 3.7"H × 3.1"D (192 mm × 93 mm × 80 mm) including stand.

=== Transporter (September 2006) ===
Fifth generation hardware. Features are similar to Squeezebox v3. Geared towards audiophiles. Additional features over Squeezebox v3 include dual 320×32 pixel displays, front panel buttons and tactile feedback knob, redesigned backlit remote control, balanced (XLR) and unbalanced audio outputs, balanced and unbalanced digital inputs and outputs (AES/EBU and S/PDIF) (inputs for operation as a standalone DAC), RS-232 serial connection for external control, Infrared input and output.

=== Squeezebox Duet (January 2008) ===
This new design consists of a more sophisticated remote, called the Squeezebox Controller (aka SBC) with a display (like the Sonos), and a separate simplified network music player box, called the Squeezebox Receiver (aka SBR) connecting to the stereo. The SBR can operate without the SBC, although that is not supported by Logitech and is recommended for advanced users only. The SBC can also operate as an audio player through its integrated speaker or through its integrated headphone jack. Additional SBRs could be bought separately.

Differences between the Squeezebox Classic and the Squeezebox Duet include:

- The SBR does not have a display (only a multi-coloured status LED), instead relying on the Controller for its user interface.
- The SB3 has a headphone jack. In the Duet there is a headphone jack on the SBC only.
- The SB3 uses infrared for remote control while the Duet uses WiFi for the same purpose. The absence of IR remote control eliminates compatibility with universal remote controls. The SBC has IR transmission capabilities, which can be used to control other devices e.g. the power and volume of a connected amplifier.
- The DAC from SB3 is a Burr-Brown 24-bit DAC, and the one on the SBR of the Duet is a Wolfson 24-bit DAC.
- The total harmonic distortion on the SB3 is less than -93.5 dB (0.002%) and on the SBR of the Duet is less than -88 dB (0.004%).
- The Squeezebox Classic cost US$300 and the Duet $400.

The Squeezebox Controller is the first unit in the Squeezebox line that runs on SqueezeOS, an embedded Linux distribution. These devices are less "slim" than the previous Squeezeboxes. The Squeezebox Radio and the Squeezebox Touch are also SqueezeOS based.

As the Squeezebox Controller had largely been rendered obsolete by smartphone and tablet PC apps, and the Squeezebox Touch surpasses the Squeezebox Receiver in all respects, the Squeezebox Duet was discontinued in early 2011.

=== Squeezebox Boom (August 2008) ===
In a departure from previous models, the Boom combines Squeezebox functionality with a DSP, a 30 W integrated amplifier and bi-amped stereo two-way speakers to produce a self-contained device which requires only a network connection (either wired or wireless) and power. Without a network connection, the Boom can still amplify and play a line level signal from an external player through a 3.5mm mini-jack plug.

The Squeezebox Boom was discontinued in early 2011, with no replacement model.

=== Squeezebox Radio (September 2009) ===
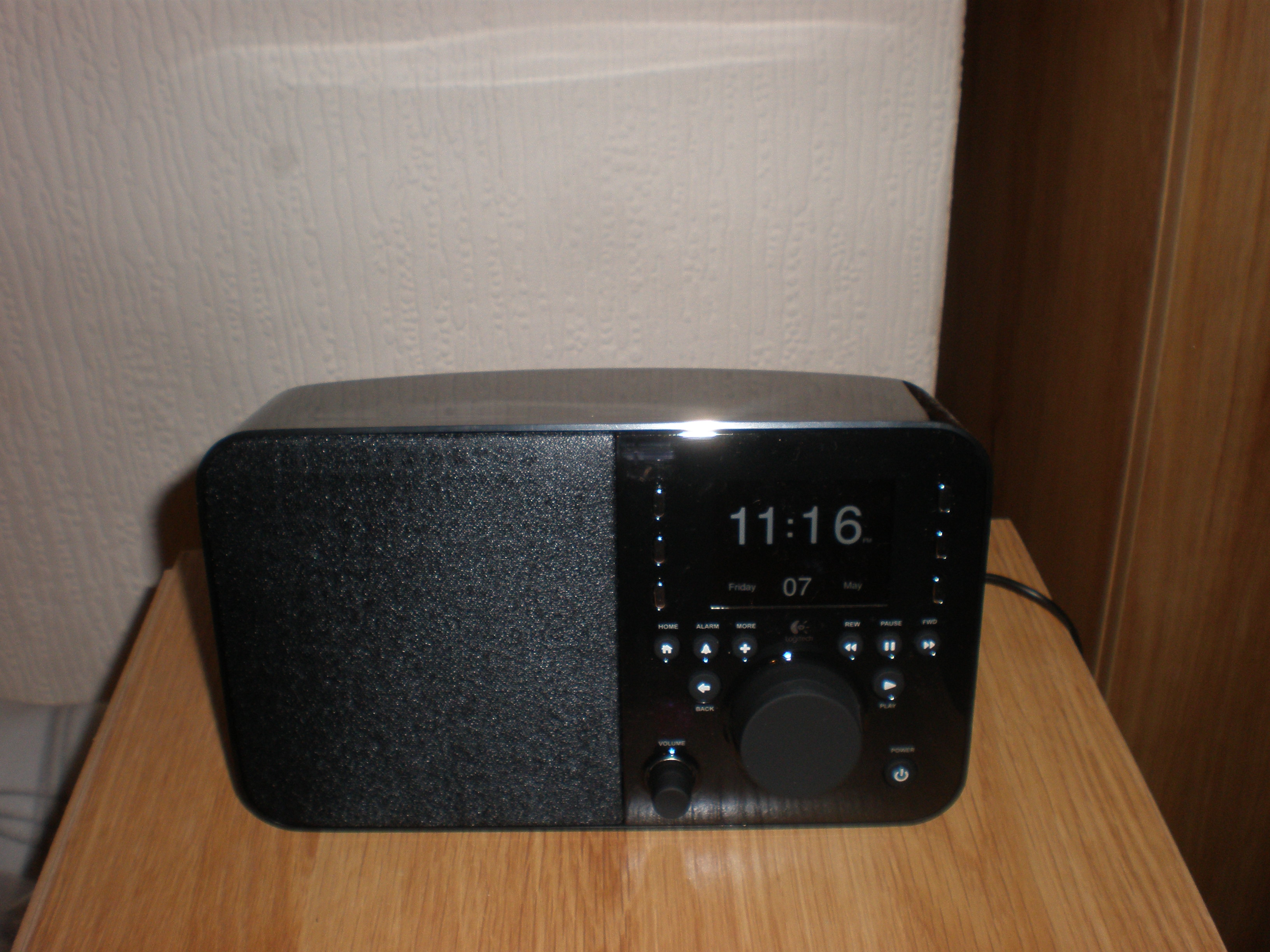
Squeezebox Radio

Squeezebox Radio adds a color screen (2.4") to the all-in-one design of its older sibling, Squeezebox Boom, but only in a mono configuration. The Squeezebox Radio can be powered by an optional proprietary battery pack, made available in March 2010. When running off Logitech Media Server, two Squeezebox Radios can be synchronized and set to play one stereo channel each, thus working as a stereo device. Also, by using headphones one can use one single Squeezebox Radio as a stereo device.

=== Squeezebox Touch (April 2010) ===
The Squeezebox Touch is the functional successor of the SB3, and has a couple of new features:

- 4.3" colour touchscreen
- Play songs stored on memory card or USB disk, although it can only handle playlists of 100 songs or less when doing this.
- Supports 16- and 24-bit audio with a sampling rate of up to 96 kHz (or up to 192 kHz, enabled by use of a free third-party plug-in.)
- Supports asynchronous USB digital audio output, enabled by use of a free third-party plug-in.
- Latest software versions enable native WMA lossless support.

=== UE Smart Radio (Late 2012) ===
The UE Smart Radio is visually similar to the Squeezebox Radio but has a simplified interface and limited functionality. It has an interface option to switch to the Squeezebox firmware. It was discontinued in 2014.

== Shutdown ==
In January 2024 Squeezebox users received a message that the Squeezebox servers would shut down in February 2024, making the Squeezebox devices unusable unless you set up your own Squeezebox server. Squeezebox offered a download for such a server software. On 19 March 2024 the Squeezebox servers were shut down. The remaining option for users of Squeezebox devices is to run the open source Lyrion Music Server.

== See also ==
- Airport Express
- AudioTron
- Firefly Media Server
- Music Player Daemon
- Sonos
- SoundBridge
- Windows Media Connect
