= The Living Room EP =

EP by The Seldon Plan
- Released: July 31, 2003
- Recorded: June 2003
- Studio: Waterford Digital, in Pasadena, Maryland
- Genre: Indie rock, pop, alternative rock
- Length: 21:37
- Label: The Beechfields
- Producer: Frank Marchand, The Seldon Plan

The Seldon Plan chronology
The Living Room EP (2003)	Making Circles (2005)

The Living Room EP is the debut album from the American rock band the Seldon Plan.

== Content ==
The seven-track indie pop rock album was released on compact disc and digital download with The Beechfields Record Label, on July 31, 2003. It was recorded by Frank Marchand in June of that year, at Waterford Digital in Pasadena, Maryland, with production by Marchand and the Seldon Plan. The songs on The Living Room EP are loosely stitched together, and it contains lush sounds, and scraped, distorted guitars. It draws comparison to the music of artists on the independent record label Deep Elm Records, the indie rock band Unrest, and the alternative rock band Tsunami, and the vocals are likened to the new wave band Tears for Fears vocalist, Roland Orzabal.

Professional ratings
Review scores
Source	Rating
AllMusic	2.5/5 stars

A review from AllMusic says "though promising, the Seldon Plan's debut is a bit odd. The Baltimore quartet [...] seems intent on crafting a mature indie pop sound [that] continues tingeing instrumentally toward a slightly angular, emo-influenced sound."

== Track listing ==
No.	Title	Length
1.	"Neveragain, Michigan"	2:49
2.	"Charles Olsen"	3:22
3.	"Faker"	3:27
4.	"Down in a Fog"	4:01
5.	"You Got It (The Way)"	3:27
6.	"The Curse of a Round Face"	2:47
7.	"Trotwood"	2:59
Total length:		21:37

== Personnel ==
- Mike Landavere – drums
- Bobby Landle – guitar
- Dave Hirner – bass
- Michael Nestor – vocals and guitar
