= Joggler =

Joggler may refer to:

- Joggling, sport combining juggling and jogging
- O2 Joggler, internet computing appliance
