= Lenro =

- Website type: Book exchange community
- Available in: English
- Owner: Saurabh Hooda
- Website: lenro.co
- Registration: Free
- Current status: Inactive

Lenro was a book sharing website that connected book readers on the local level so that they could borrow, lend or exchange books with each other. Members need to create a free account to borrow, lend or exchange books.

== Site description ==
Lenro users could search for a book to check its availability to borrow or could see all the books that are available near them. The website would tell the user the distance to the other Lenro users nearby. The borrower send a borrow request to the lender which the lender was able to either accept or reject. Members could communicate on Lenro chat and finalize a date, time, and venue to meet for the book exchange.

Members' profile page would show the social profiles (such as Facebook and LinkedIn) of the member so that other users could have a look at those profiles to gain some level of trust before meeting for the first time. Members could also rate and review the books. The website had a system of gamification called Karma points. Members would obtain points for activities like adding a book to lend, adding a book review, and borrowing/lending a book.

== See also ==
- Book swapping
