= BookMooch =

Online book exchange community

- Website type: Book exchange community
- Owner: John Buckman
- Creator: John Buckman
- Website: www.bookmooch.com
- Commercial: Yes
- Registration: Free
- Launched: 2006
- Current status: Online

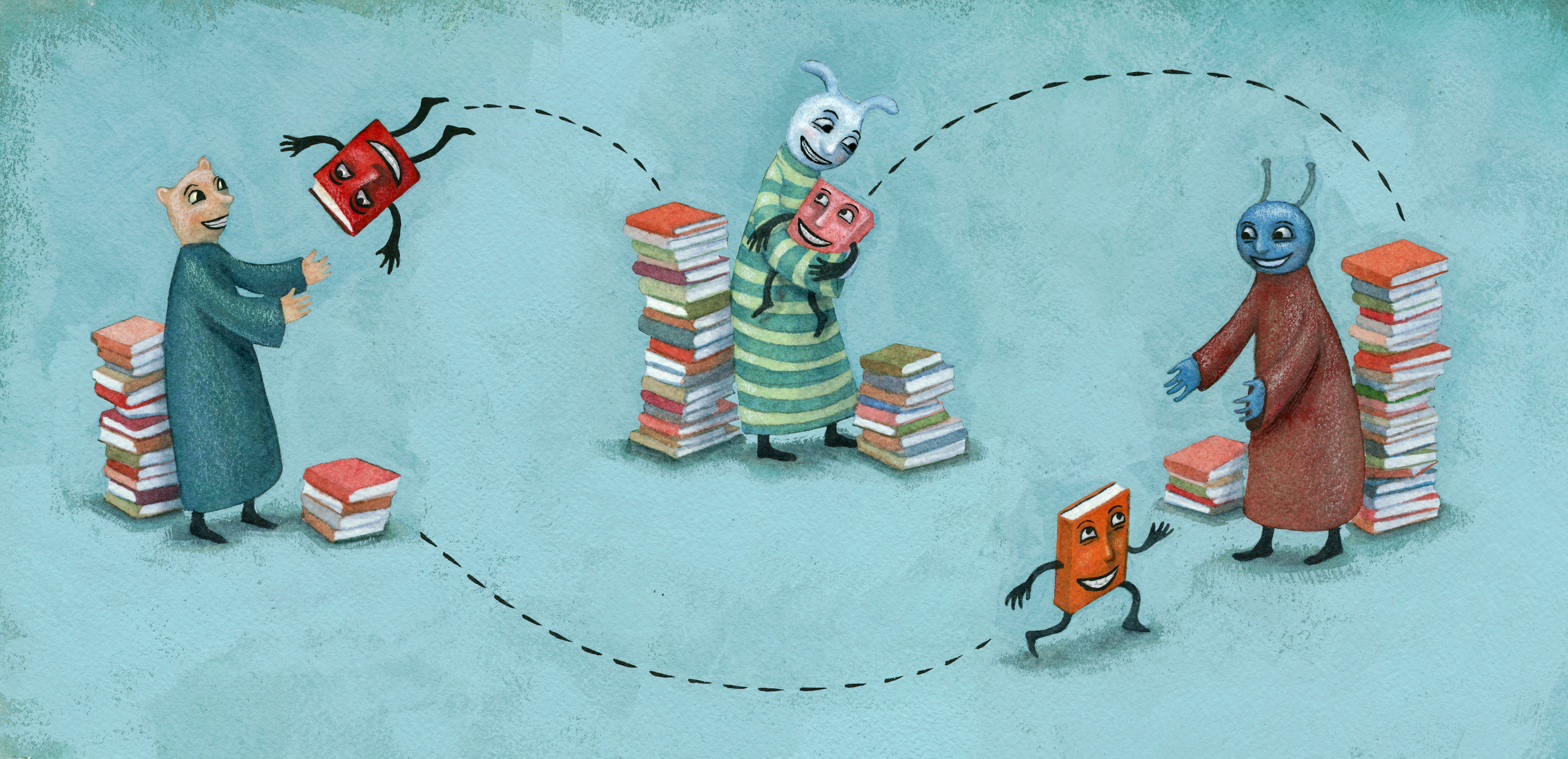
BookMooch illustration

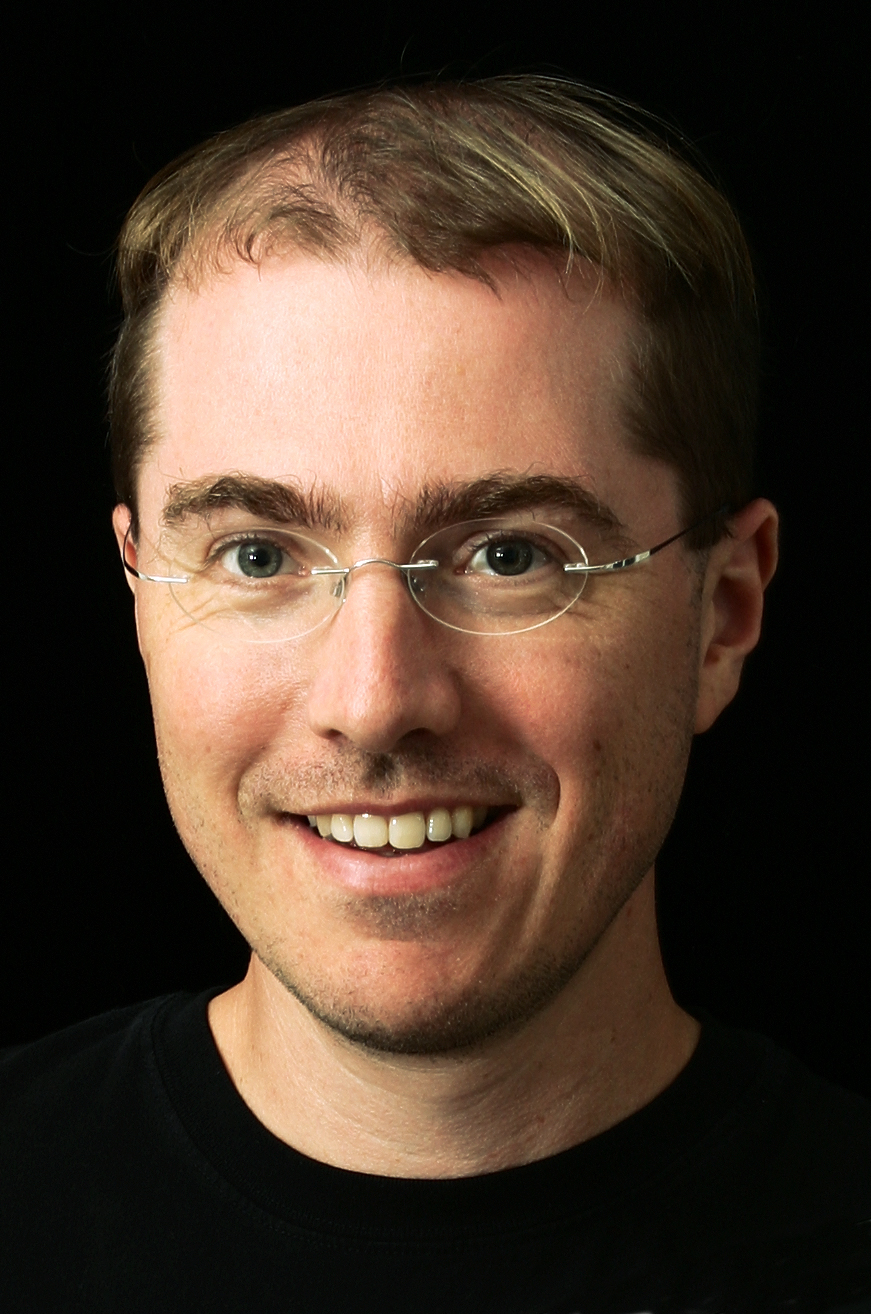
John Buckman

BookMooch is an international online book exchange community founded by John Buckman in 2006. By 2008, membership reached around 74,000 users in over 90 countries and about 2,000 books are swapped per day.

== Site description ==
BookMooch allows users to exchange books using a points system. Members earn points by adding books to their inventories, sending books to other members, and providing feedback when they receive books. Points earned can then be used to “buy” books from other members. All books “cost” the same number of points, with a multiple-point surcharge for international "mooches." Members may opt to send books only within their own country, worldwide, or worldwide upon request.

Member pages contain biographical information, conditions of trade, and links to their transaction histories. Widgets allow members to personalize their pages and listings. Links to Amazon sites in various countries allow members to enter books into the system quickly. A notification system e-mails members when a book on their Wish list becomes available and directs them to the Mooch screen for that book.

Members may choose to donate points to a charity such as Books for Prisons, public libraries, education and counseling services, or children's and military book charities. Charities can then use their points to acquire books.

== Organization ==
John Buckman has continued to maintain and add features to the site since its inception. He manages the site with the assistance of a small, international admin team who participate in the forums and resolve any issues. The Official BookMooch Blog records his travels, new BookMooch projects, ideas, and solicits input and feedback. Members of the forum contribute help and advice, feature suggestions, book talk, chat, and “special offers.”

== Member contributions ==
Members are active in suggesting and contributing features to the system. Member-run, associated BookMooch activities include:

- The BookMooch Angel Network – In response to increases in postal rates which discourage some users from mailing abroad, a group of volunteer “angels” exist who will mooch books within their own country and send them on to members in other countries;
- The BookMooch Support Group–Is for members who commit to reading at least two of their stacked-up To Be Read piles during the month and post reviews to the Support Group's blog, The Smoke Lives.
- The BookMooch Journal Project – Journals/Notebooks posted by a member for Mooching. Each member who mooches contributes artwork or as directed by the originator and adds the book to their inventory to be Mooched.
- BookMooch Friends –is a Yahoo social group for getting to know one another outside the trading environment
- BookMooch Barter – where members can swap things other than books
- BookMooch Lottery – an occasional activity where members pool points. Half the pool goes to a random selection of members; half to charity.

Under discussion is a member-run Bank of BookMooch where members who are short of points can borrow and repay them later. Members also write documentation and help features and maintain the BookMooch Wiki.

The site has an API allowing developers to create their web applications.

== Transparency ==
Transparency of behavior is a key component of BookMooch. Recipients of books assign feedback to each transaction and a history for each member is open to view. A balanced ratio of mooching to giving must be maintained by each member to continue to receive books. Both the forums and the feedback/e-mail systems generally allow users to resolve any differences amicably.

== Income ==
BookMooch is a for-profit corporation wholly owned by Buckman, but it does not charge membership or use fees. Revenue is generated from users' voluntary fiscal contributions and from commissions when users purchase a book from Amazon.com through referral by the site. As of December 2006, for approximately every 30 books mooched, one book is purchased from Amazon.

== See also ==
- Book swapping
