= That Time You Dreamed EP =

That Time You Dreamed

EP by The Seldon Plan
- Released: April 23, 2013
- Recorded: July 2012 and March 2013
- Genre: Indie pop, alternative rock
- Length: 8:59
- Label: Modern Hymnal Recordings
- Producer: Frank Marchand and The Seldon Plan

The Seldon Plan chronology
Coalizione del Volere (2011)	That Time You Dreamed (2013)

That Time You Dreamed is an EP from The Seldon Plan. The record features Michael Nestor on guitars, vocals and keyboards, Frank Corl on percussion, and Kresimir Tokic on bass, replacing founding bassist David Hirner. The Big Takeover named the record a top 10 and wrote, "Their brisk indie pop and angular post-rock has given way to languid, hazy dreampop/shoegaze..." The slower music, and "hazy, dreamy guitarwork" is departure from previous Seldon Plan work. Independent Clauses writes that the songs on this EP, "...are consistently welcoming..." and compares That Time You Dreamed to Copeland.

== Track listing ==
1. "That Time You Dreamed" - 3.52
2. "Setting The Scene" - 2:31
3. "Revelation 1.0" - 2:36
