= The Seldon Plan =

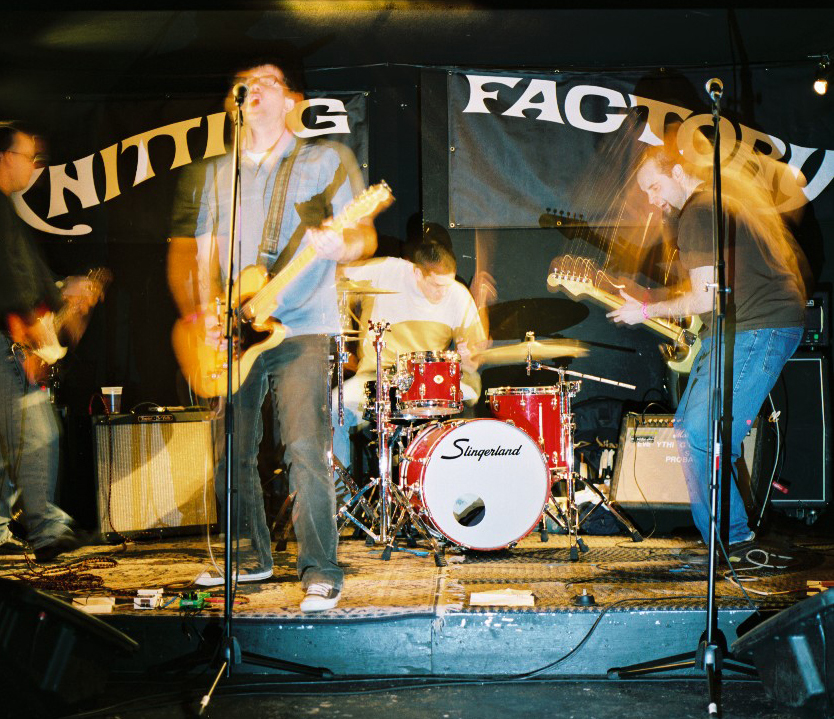
- The Seldon Plan in New York City, 2006

Background information
- Origin: Baltimore, Maryland, United States
- Genres: Indie rock, Indie pop
- Years active: 2002–2013
- Labels: Magnatune, The Beechfields Record Label, OTP Records, Modern Hymnal Recordings

The Seldon Plan is a post-rock pop band from Baltimore, Maryland, United States. The group is primarily associated with the indie rock scene in the Northeast U.S.

== History ==
While primarily playing indie rock that is reminiscent of The Weakerthans, The Feelies, Nada Surf and Camera Obscura, their sound has also been compared to and influenced by indie pop and emo.

The Seldon Plan was founded in 2002 by guitarist Bobby Landle and bassist Dave Hirner. Landle chose the name for the band as a reference to Isaac Asimov. In late 2003, Hirner and Landle met Michael Nestor at the University of Maryland School of Medicine via an ad placed on a local music website. The earliest performances featured the use of a drum machine with occasional appearances from percussionist Austin Stahl, who provided drums for the first Seldon Plan demo. In 2003, the trio met drummer and multi-percussionist Mike Landavere and as a result, the band took a more dynamic and engaging approach. Stahl continued work with Private Eleanor and The Beechfields Record Label, which released the first Seldon Plan EP.

The Seldon Plan started out by performing at non-traditional venues like art galleries and DIY spaces in Baltimore. Many of their early shows were part of the DIY renaissance that began in the Baltimore music scene in the early 2000s. During these performances they gained notoriety by inviting artists, poets, and filmmakers to display their work concurrently with the music.

Throughout 2005-2008, the core line-up of Hirner, Landavere, Landle, and Nestor took on a busy tour schedule and released two critically well-received full-length records while supporting shows with Explosions in the Sky, The Stills, Now It's Overhead, The Octopus Project and Matt Pond PA. In 2008, the band was highlighted in the Music Alive! magazine along with Joan as Police Woman. Shortly thereafter Landle and Landavere left the original lineup. From 2009-2011, Hirner and Nestor included musicians from local Baltimore bands to help with recording and touring. In 2011, founding member Hirner left The Seldon Plan. During 2012-2013, Nestor, percussionist Frank Corl, and bassist Kresimir Tokic continued to record as The Seldon Plan. In 2014, Corl and Nestor formed the indie rock group Underlined Passages.

== Releases ==
The Living Room EP was released in 2003 on The Beechfields Record Label. Although thought to be a well-produced demo, the CD was picked up by a number of college and internet radio stations and earned the band some local notoriety including a review in Allmusic.

In 2005, The Seldon Plan released their first full-length, Making Circles. Making Circles received a number of positive reviews in the United States and in Europe. The record was featured on NPR, and was named a top 40 record of 2005 by The Big Takeover. Songs from "Making Circles" were featured in a number of indie films, Current TV, episodes of the lonelygirl15 series, a T&C Surf Design advertisement and used in some early iPhone applications. Originally released on Stahl's Baltimore-based OTPRecords, Making Circles was re-released in 2006 by Magnatune.

In October 2007, The Seldon Plan released their second full-length The Collective Now on Magnatune. The Collective Now was named one of the "Best Baltimore albums of 2007" by The Baltimore Sun. The Collective Now received national attention when it was used as an example in press reports about the loudness wars. Referencing the loudness of the Magnatune version of the record, Nestor was quoted saying, "we had to compromise our principles to get noticed." In response to the loudness wars debate, the band released a quieter re-press of the record on The Beechfields Record Label in December, 2007.

The Seldon Plan's third full length, Lost and Found and Lost was released in June 2009 and focused on the 2008 financial crisis and the election of President Barack Obama. Hirner and Nestor were joined by guitarist and vocalist Dawn Dineen and percussionist Matthew Leffler-Schulman. Lost and Found and Lost was described by Brian McTernan as "catchy simple melodies awash with lush vocals, hip full guitars, and a hint of Flaming Lips" and by Mark Degli Antoni as "smart pop with no wasted space". Lost and Found and Lost was also highlighted as a "top 40" record at The Big Takeover by Jack Rabid. The general theme of the record centered on Nestor's personal reaction to the economic recession of 2008.

In 2011, The Seldon Plan released their fourth full length, titled Coalizione del Volere. Along with the core of Corl, Hirner and Nestor, the record featured guitarist Chris Ehrich. Coalizione del Volere was described as a return to the more angular indie rock sounds of The Collective Now and Making Circles. The record tangentially deals with the theme of mass marketing in the digital age. As described by Nestor, "I used to go to the record store and buy a tape, take it home and pop it in the cassette player and pull out the liner notes," Nestor says. "Then I'd go to school and find two or three people that liked the same band and they would be my best friend. Now it's like the whole school is your best friend. How is the listening experience special? I think that's why vinyl is making such a comeback, because you don't get mass marketing. You actually have to take the record out, put it on a record player and listen to it." Coalizione del Volere was released as The Seldon Plan's first vinyl LP.

In 2013, Corl, Nestor, and Tokic released the That Time You Dreamed EP on Modern Hymnal Recordings. The Big Takeover highlighted the EP as a "weekly top 10" noting, "Their brisk indie pop and angular post-rock has given way to languid, hazy dreampop/shoegaze..." .

== Discography ==
- The Living Room EP (2003), The Beechfields Record Label
- Making Circles (2005), OTP Records
- Live at the Creative Commons Salon (2006), Magnatune
- The 2007 Magnatune Records Sampler (2007), Magnatune
- The Collective Now (2007), Magnatune (re-released on The Beechfields Record Label)
- This City of Neighborhoods (Beechfields Compilation Record) (2008), The Beechfields Record Label
- Lost and Found and Lost (2009), The Beechfields Record Label, (re-released on Magnatune)
- Coalizione del Volere (2011), Magnatune (re-released on The Beechfields Record Label)
- That Time You Dreamed EP (2013), Modern Hymnal Recordings

== Members ==
=== Founding Members ===
- David Hirner – bass (2002–2011)
- Mike Landavere - percussion (2003-2008)
- Bobby Landle - vocals and guitar (2002-2008)
- Michael Nestor – vocals and guitar (2003–2013)

=== Former Members ===
- Frank Corl – drums (2010–2013)
- Dawn Dineen - guitars and vocals (2008-2009)
- Chris Ehrich – guitars and vocals (2010–2011)
- Matthew Leffler-Schulman – drums (2008-2009)
- Kresimir Tokic - bass (2012-2013)
