= PaperBackSwap =

PaperBackSwap (PBS) is a book swapping website which was founded in 2004. The purpose of PaperBackSwap is to use the Internet to facilitate the parity trading of books among members in the United States using a credit based system for swapping. The club also operates sister websites SwapaDVD and SwapaCD to facilitate parity trading of DVDs and CDs, respectively.

== History ==
PaperBackSwap was founded in 2004 by Richard Pickering, a former economics student, and his friend, Robert Swarthout. Sister websites SwapaCD and SwapaDVD were founded in 2008.

== Operation ==
A credit system is used to enable members to trade books for credits and credits for books. Credits may either be purchased, or they may be earned by mailing books which have been requested. Consequently, a member need not seek another member who desires a parity trade; credits are the medium of exchange. Both paperback and hardback books may be traded, as well as audiobooks. Within the PBS system the value of any bound book is one credit, and the value of an audio book is two credits.

Pickering patented several embodiments of the program with the US Patent Office involving the swapping process of books, CDs and DVDs. Pickering continues to run the company to date.
