= Underlined Passages =

American rock band

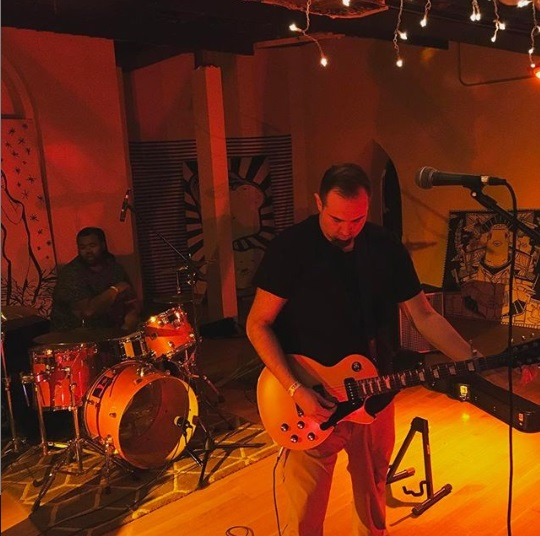
- Underlined Passages in 2017.

Background information
- Origin: Baltimore, Maryland, U.S.
- Genres: Indie rock, indie pop
- Years active: 2014–present
- Label: Mint 400 Records
- Members: Michael Nestor, Roger Stewart
- Website: underlineslove.com

Underlined Passages is an American rock band from Baltimore, Maryland.

== History ==
Underlined Passages was started as a duo studio project in 2014 by Frank Corl and Michael Nestor-former drummer, lead singer and guitarist of the band The Seldon Plan, when The Seldon Plan disbanded in 2013. . Shortly after Corl left the band in 2015, Nestor formed a live version of the band with bassist Rich Marcinek and percussionist Chris Shelley. In 2015, drummer Jamaal Turner joined the group and has appeared on all subsequent releases. Also In 2015, Underlined Passages joined Mint 400 Records and between 2015 and 2017 released three records with the label while touring as a live act.

=== Releases ===
Underlined passages released their first self-titled record in April, 2015. In April, 2016, they released their second full-length album, The Fantastic Quest. The single "Calamine" was subsequently released in May, 2016. During tour support for their recent records, Underlined Passages performed at the 2016 and 2017 North Jersey Indie Rock Festival.

In September 2017, Underlined Passages released their third album Tandi My Dicafi. The single "Silverlake" is a reference to Silver Lake, Los Angeles, California, an area that inspired Nestor and Turner during the writing and production. Nestor and Turner cite the music of Flying Nun Records as inspiration for the record. In early 2018, Tandi My Dicafi was released in limited edition vinyl, with bonus tracks "We Lost The Sea (Coda)" and "Interregnum," in conjunction with a tour of the East Coast of the United States.

The band released their fifth full-length record, Landfill Indie in November 2024 (after 2022's Neon Inoculation). Described as a protest record against the term "landfill indie" used by a 2020 Vice article, the band was named to the lineup of the 2025 Let's Go Music Festival.

In October 2025, the band announced and released a new record, recorded with J Robbins, titled The Accelerationists

== Members ==
- Michael Nestor – vocals and guitar (2014–present)
- Roger Stewart - drums (2024-present)

Former members

- Jamaal Turner – drums (2015–2023)
- Roy Colquitt – bass (2017–2019)
- Frank Corl – drums (2014–2015)
- Rich Marcinek – bass (2015–2016)
- Chris Shelley – drums (2015)

== Discography ==
Albums

- Underlined Passages (2015)
- The Fantastic Quest (2016)
- Tandi My Dicafi (2017)
- Neon Inoculation (2022)
- His Head Feels Like A Trainwreck Tonight [EP] (2022)
- Landfill Indie (2024)
- The Accelerationists (2025)

Singles

- "Everyone Was There" (2016)
- "Calamine" (2016)
- "Silverlake" (2017)

Appearing on

- In a Mellow Tone (2015)
