= ReadItSwapIt =

ReadItSwapIt (RISI) was a book exchange website co-founded in 2005 by Andrew Bathgate and Neil Ferguson of London, UK. And closed in Sept 2017. It facilitated direct swapping of books among its members in the UK.

== Operation ==
ReadItSwapIt operated a "direct swap" method of exchange, where a single book belonging to one member was exchanged for a single book belonging to another member. This is contrast to other book swap sites, which offer a credit-based system of exchange.
