= Firefly Media Server =

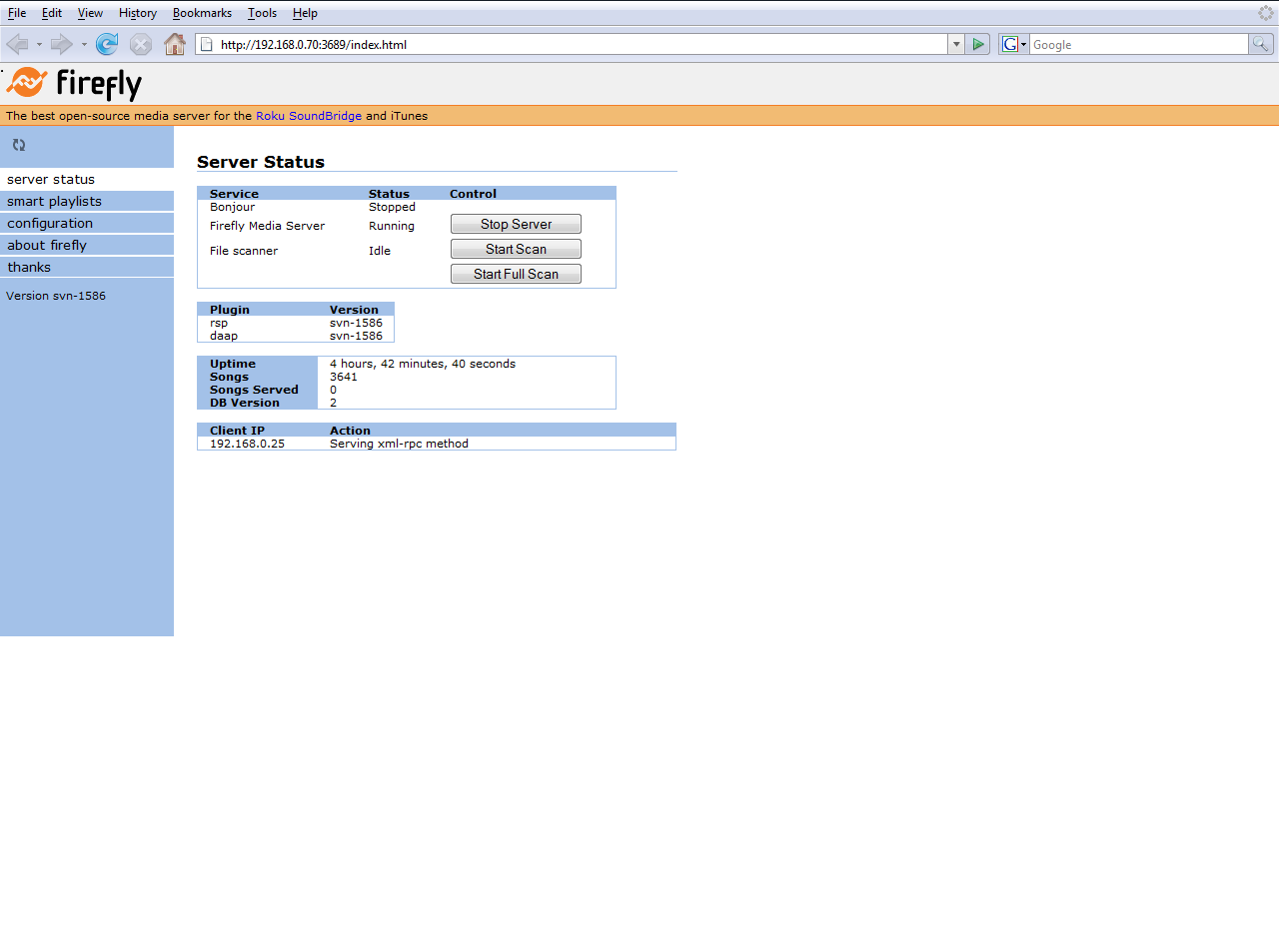
- Developer: Ron Pedde
- Initial release: 0.1.0
- Final release: 0.2.4.2 (April 19, 2008) [±]
- Preview release: SVN/Nightly Builds (SVN) [±]
- Written in: C
- Available in: English
- Type: Media Server
- License: GPL-2.0-or-later
- Website: fireflymediaserver.net

Firefly Media Server (formerly mt-daapd) is an open-source audio media server (or daemon) for the Roku SoundBridge and iTunes. It serves media files using Roku Server Protocol (RSP) and Digital Audio Access Protocol (DAAP).

== Features ==
Its features include:

- Support for running on Unix/POSIX platforms
- Support for running on Microsoft Windows and Mac OS X
- Support for running on the Apple Inc. iPhone and iPod Touch
- Support for MP3, AAC, Ogg, FLAC, and WMA
- Support for Roku SoundBridge via RSP
- Support for on-the-fly transcoding of Ogg, FLAC, ALAC, and WMA
- On Windows platforms, on-the-fly transcoding of WMA Lossless, WMA Pro and WMA Voice.
- Web-based configuration
- Support for user-created smart playlists
- Integration with iTunes library including reading playlists
- Supports serving streaming radio stations

Firefly Media Server was formerly known as mt-daapd. It was renamed when it adopted new features such as support for RSP and support for Microsoft Windows and Mac OS X.

== Latest developments ==
Firefly Media Server is not under active development, although there have been a few attempts to resurrect it. There has been an abortive effort to continue this project as Firefly2 Media Server without any developers coming forward, however the old forums and links to many forked versions are available at the new website. Since July 2009, development continued on a Linux/FreeBSD fork named forked-daapd. forked-daapd later renamed to OwnTone Server.

== Client players ==
- DAAP (Android audio player)
- Rhythmbox, Banshee, and Amarok (Linux media players)

== See also ==
- SlimServer
