= Making Circles =

Studio album by The Seldon Plan
- Released: April 2005
- Recorded: February–March, 2005
- Genres: Indie rock Pop; Alternative rock
- Length: 39:12
- Labels: Magnatune and OTPRecords
- Producers: Frank Marchand and The Seldon Plan

The Seldon Plan chronology
The Living Room EP (2003)	Making Circles (2005)	The Collective Now (2007)

Professional ratings
Review scores
Source	Rating
ReadJunk	3/5 stars

Making Circles is the second album released by indie rock band The Seldon Plan, released in April 2005 by OTPRecords and re-released in September 2005 by Magnatune. Songs from this record were featured on Current TV, NPR, and the lonelygirl15 series.

== Track listing ==
1. "A Rhyming Dictionary" – 3:56
2. "Making Circles" – 2:48
3. "Westchester" – 2:03
4. "Top Left Corner" – 3:35
5. “[Aperitif]” – 3:24
6. "Holding Patterns Are Slow" – 3:49
7. "Love Again" – 3:13
8. "Eyes Closed" – 3:42
9. "Your Unmuddied Pasts" – 3:32
10. "New Instant" – 3:33
11. "Checkered Flag" – 2:52
12. "Samuel P. Huntington" – 4:26
13. "Chicago 2003" – 4:23
