= Squeezelite =

Streaming audio software

- Original author(s): Adrian Smith
- Developer(s): Ralph Irving
- Stable release: 1.9.1 / 8 October 2019; 5 years ago
- Preview release: 1.8.6 / 5 December 2016; 8 years ago
- Repository: github.com/ralph-irving/squeezelite
- Written in: C
- Platform: IA-32, x86-64, ARM, MIPS
- Type: Streaming audio emulator
- License: GPLv3
- Website: code.google.com/p/squeezelite/

Squeezelite is one of several software clients available for Logitech/Lyrion Music Server. Squeezelite does not have any user interface of its own and must be controlled via Lyrion Music Server's web interface or another Lyrion Music Server client.

== Features ==
Squeezelite supports gapless playback, a wide range of sample rates (44.1 kHz / 48 kHz / 88.2 kHz / 96 kHz / 176.4 kHz / 192 kHz / 352.8 kHz / 384 kHz) and direct streaming for Lyrion Music Server plugins that require it such as Spotify. It is capable of utilizing Lyrion Music Server's client synchronization feature which allows grouping clients for simultaneous, synchronized music playback. Squeezelite uses ALSA for audio output on Linux and PortAudio for other platforms.

== History ==
Development of Squeezelite began in 2012 in response to the technical limitations of other Lyrion Music Server software clients. The first stable version of Squeezelite was released on February 15, 2013.
