= Slim Devices =

American consumer electronics company

Slim Devices, Inc.
- Company type: Division
- Industry: Electronics
- Founded: 2000
- Headquarters: Mountain View, California, U.S.A.
- Key people: Sean Adams (Founder)
- Products: Squeezebox and Transporter
- Parent: Logitech
- Website: Slim Devices, Inc.

Slim Devices, Inc. was a consumer electronics company based in Mountain View, California, United States. Their main product was the Squeezebox network music player which connects to a home ethernet or Wi-Fi network, and allows the owner to stream digital audio over the network to a stereo. The company, founded in 2000, was originally most notable for their support of open-source software, namely their SlimServer software which their products at that time all depended upon, and is still available as a free download and modification by any interested developer.

On 18 October 2006 Sean Adams, the CEO of Slim Devices, announced that the company was being fully acquired by Logitech.

Slim Devices was featured in the December 2006 issue of Fast Company magazine. The article focused on the company's business model and profiled the three key leaders: Sean Adams (CEO), Dean Blackketter (CTO), and Patrick Cosson (VP of Marketing).
