= Book swapping =

Practice of a swap of books between one person and another

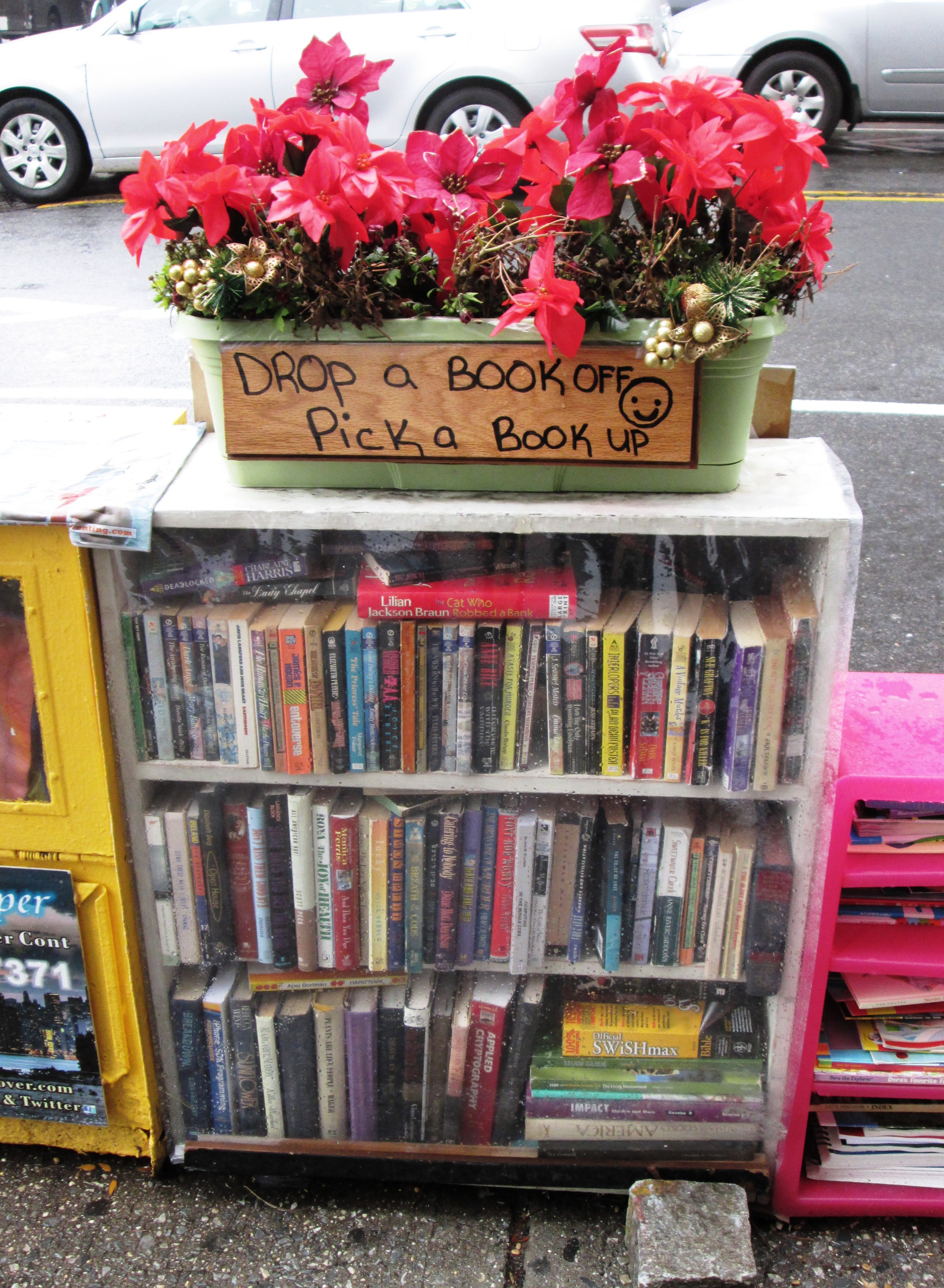
A "street book exchange" in Washington Heights, Manhattan

Book swapping or book exchange is the practice of a swap of books between one person and another. Practiced among book groups, friends and colleagues at work, it provides an inexpensive way for people to exchange books, find out about new books and obtain a new book to read without having to pay. Because swaps occur between individuals, without central distribution or warehousing, and without the copyright owner making a profit, the practice has been compared to peer-to-peer (P2P) systems such as BitTorrent—except that hard-copy original analog objects are exchanged.

== College book exchange programs ==
Many colleges and universities have developed online book exchange programs to help students save money on textbooks. Some colleges build their own systems and others use systems from third party service providers.

== Informal book exchanges ==
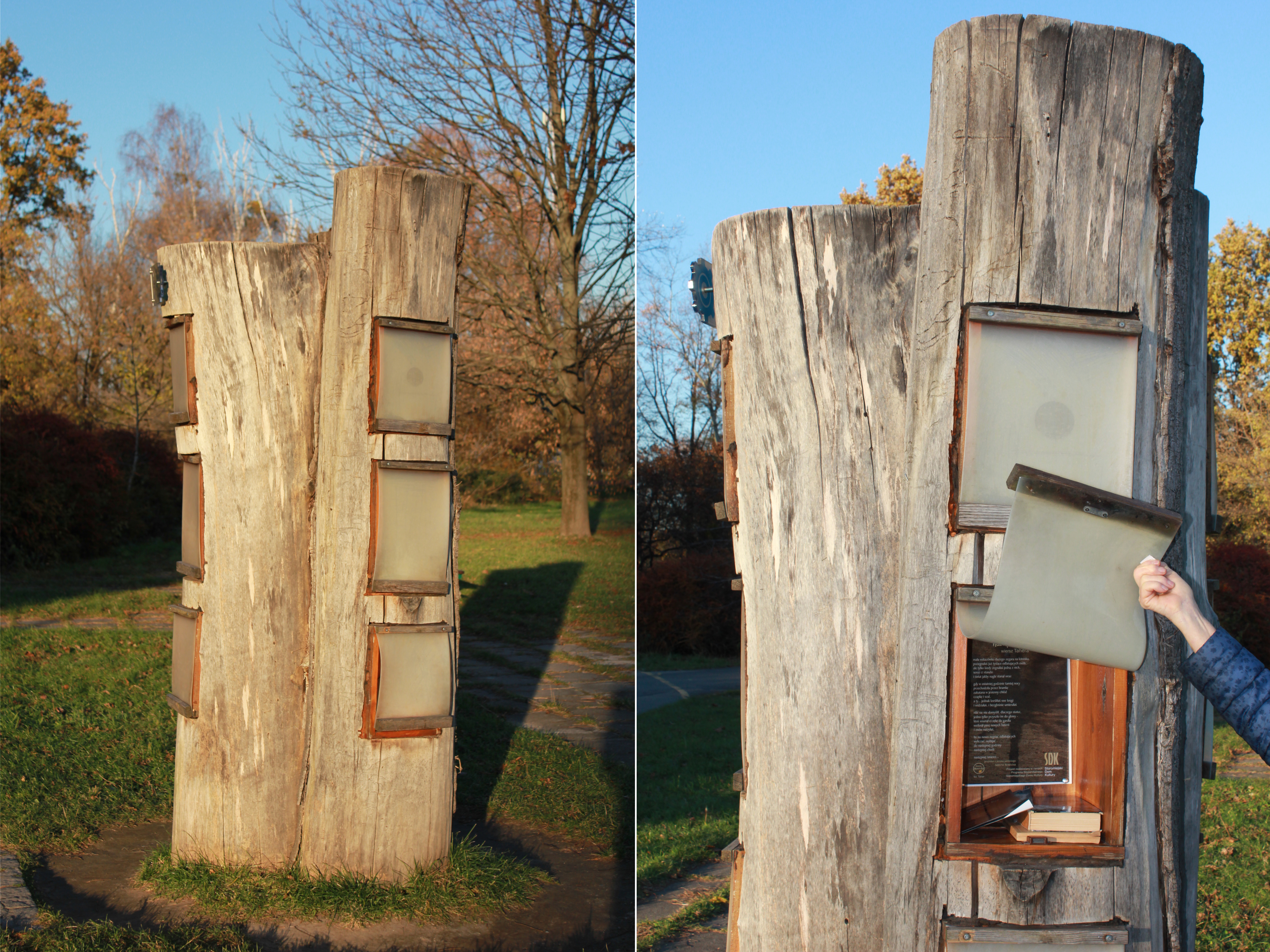
Juxtaposition of a "closed" and "open" outdoor book exchange in a park, Warsaw, Poland

Some book exchanges are informal – a shelf or box is provided where books can be left or picked up. The exchange relies on users leaving and taking books and is generally not supervised.

This is a frequent practice in youth hostels where travellers can leave a book and take a different book with them. Some railway stations in Great Britain have informal book exchanges and one has also been set up in a phone box in Kington Magna.

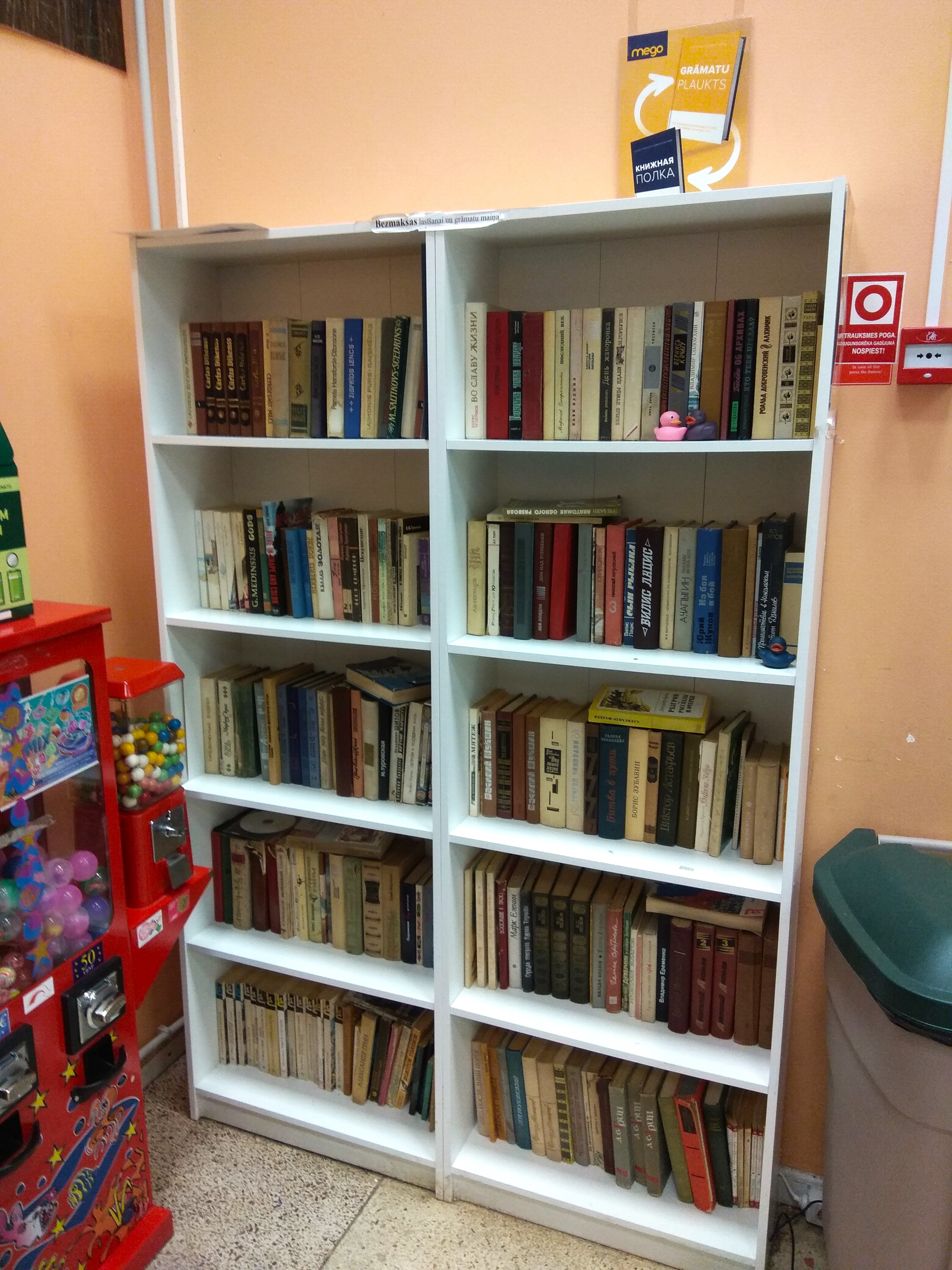
Bookshelf for free exchange in a supermarket, Riga, Latvia

Such bookshelves are popular also in Baltic states, funded by local municipalities or by the governments. In Riga, the society "Zero Waste Latvia" counted more than 20 bookshelves and boxes in 2024.

== Book swapping websites ==
- BookCrossing, an online book swapping site
- BookMooch, an online book swapping site
- ReadItSwapIt, an online book swapping site
- Little Free Library, trading posts that offer free books, housed in small containers, to members of the local community
- PaperBackSwap, an online book swapping club restricted to the United States
- Lenro, used to connect book readers locally (same college/neighborhood)

== See also ==
- Collaborative consumption, a trend describing similar swapping and lending organizations
- Public bookcase
