= Ampache =

American Software

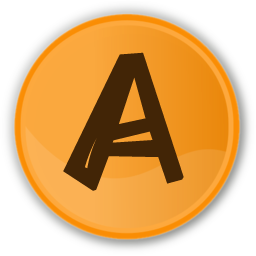
- For the Love of Music
- Original author: Karl Vollmer
- Release: Apr 29, 2001
- Stable release: 8.4.0 / November, 2026
- Preview release: develop
- Written in: PHP
- Operating system: [OS Independent]
- Platform: Web platform
- Type: streaming media / file manager
- License: AGPLv3
- Website: ampache.org
- Repository: github.com/ampache/ampache/

Ampache is a free software web-based audio file manager and media server. The name is a blend of the words "amplifier" and "Apache". Originally written to take advantage of Apache's mod_mp3 module, it has since been adapted to use its own streaming method.

Ampache's Mascot is a squirrel called Fraz, originally drawn by Kirsten Petersen, later digitized by Ben Shields, and redesigned by Agnès Champavier in 2008.

== History ==
Ampache was first released in 2001. Its original author, Scott Kveton went on to create the Oregon State University Open Source Lab (OSUOSL) and passed the developmental lead to Karl Vollmer, who was responsible for it from early 2003 to early 2011. Since then, lead development of Ampache has changed hands several times. To date, Ampache has support from over 100 different contributors. The project is currently hosted on GitHub and continues to be developed by a volunteer community.

== Development goals ==
Ampache is aimed at private and small group deployments, though it supports public registration at an administrator’s discretion. It is compatible with large music libraries and can run on a wide range of hardware configurations. Key goals include maintaining a lightweight, cross-platform web interface and prioritizing ease of access, speed, and security.

== Extensions and APIs ==
Ampache also provides an application programming interface (API) for extracting meta data in the form of XML documents. Ampache data can be accessed via the many methods supported in the API, originally created for use with Amarok2, but which can also be used to create other front-ends to Ampache. Access to the API is controlled by internal Access Control Lists; for performance reasons, all requests currently have a 5000 result limit. The following applications are known to have plug-ins that use Ampache's XML API:

- Amarok (2.x)
- Coherence (UPNP A/V MediaServer)
- Rhythmbox Plugin
- Terratec Noxon iRadio
- Ampache Mobile (WebOS Client)
- AmpachPre (WebOS Client)
- AmpacheX (iPod Touch/iPhone Application)
- iAmpache (iPod Touch/iPhone application)
- Ampacheberry (Ampache client for the BlackBerry)
- Ampache HTML5 Player (Google Chrome App)

Since version 3.7.0, Ampache is compatible with Subsonic clients and Plex clients.

== In education ==
Ampache's features make it a powerful instructional and assistive technology for students with language-based learning differences. At the Chelsea School, a group of advanced technology students recognized Ampache's potential for providing important accommodations and modifications that serve their learning styles; they built and configured an Ampache server that was put to work to enhance teaching and learning in the classroom.

Ampache's video-streaming features have also been used to enhance teaching and learning at the Chelsea School. Rather than having students watch instructional videos as a group, the assigned material was streamed to their individual workstations. Independent viewing reduces distractions, and allows students to progress at their own pace, pausing to take notes or repeating segments for clarification.

== Publications ==
Ampache has been featured in numerous online blogs and technical articles. The O'Reilly book Spidering Hacks details security testing of online applications. Ampache was found to be immune to standard spidering hacks, and by focusing on security during its development, has continued to be. The code philosophy listed on Ampache's wiki specifies security as one of the most important considerations during application development.

== Version history ==
Version	Release date	Important changes
1.01	April 29, 2001	First public release
1.07	May 4, 2001	Improved interface
1.10	May 8, 2001	First PHP only version of Ampache
1.20	July 22, 2001	ID3v1.1 support added along with Genre support
2.0	February 5, 2002	Many feature enhancements per-user statistics added, restarting Apache no longer necessary when new songs are added
3.0	April 5, 2002	Randall Ehren joined development team, XML-RPC functionality added, allowing multiple Ampache instances to be linked, mod_mp3 no longer used
3.1	December 23, 2003	Complete re-write of Ampache code by Karl Vollmer and Robert Hopson, modifications to individual Apache config no longer necessary for Ampache to run
3.2	August 11, 2004	Downsampling, RSS Feeds and Now Playing added, along with numerous improvements to album art and meta-data gathering
3.3	May 17, 2005	Added GetText support, batch downloading, user registration and WMA/M4A/FLAC support, first version with native PHP installer
3.3.1	June 21, 2005	First themable version of Ampache, abandoned non-standard installation method (/docs), implemented URL method for MPD plug-in
3.3.2	October 1, 2006	Optional bandwidth-based bit rates for downsampling, Keyword Quick search on all pages, adopted new authentication system (Vauth) and new IP based ACL system
3.3.3	January 26, 2007	AJAX actions introduced in various places, democratic play, integrated Last-FM player, integrated Flash player and added HttpQ support
3.4	May 10, 2008	Complete re-write in PHP5, AJAX'd interface, active playlist, XML API, dynamic playlists added, vastly-improved browsing system introduced
3.5	May 5, 2009	Added support for Web 2.0 Style object tagging, video streaming, IPv6, additional dynamic playlist options and improved mobile device support
3.5.1	June 24, 2009	Corrected issues with API and ‘tags’, as well as certain endless loops in audio tag reading code
3.5.2	November 19, 2009	Fixed multiple bugs in API, plus tag reading issues, added album "Unknown (Broken)" for any files malformed or damaged by Ampache
3.5.3	December 20, 2009	Security release—highly recommended upgrade
3.5.4	February 2, 2010	Fixed bugs introduced in last release, plus significant improvements and fixes for localplay methods, also corrected size calculation for up to 4TB catalogs, new installations will include additional two default ACLs for API use
3.6-alpha6	May 30, 2013	Completed tagging support, improved dynamic playlists
3.7.0	May 26, 2014	New theme, Subsonic API, Plex API, favorites and wanted features, iframed player (jPlayer), plus many user experience improvements
3.8.0	June 12, 2015	Ajax page loading, UPnP, DAAP, WebDAV
3.8.1	December 8, 2015	AGPL re-licensing, Composer dependency management
3.8.2	February 4, 2016	Added Podcast support, video playlists
3.8.3	June 22, 2017	Sort by disc number, edit song comments, LDAP class rewrite
3.8.4	December 17, 2017	Added seafile catalog module, added IPv6 addresses to user history,
3.8.5	January 23, 2018	Subsonic API improvements, playlist fixes
3.8.6	March 1, 2018	Subsonic remote catalog module version 2, download release packages from update alert
3.8.7	May 16, 2018	Added .ogv encoding for more efficient streaming of MKV files
3.8.8	Jun 18, 2018	Subsonic API improvements, guest accounts can stream songs and playlists
3.8.9	September 10, 2018	Bug fixes, artist info displays properly
3.9.0	October 21, 2018	Bug fixes and minor improvements
4.0.0	November 24, 2019	First release of the 4.x series: GitHub 4.0.0 Changelog
4.4.3	June 5, 2021	Last release of the 4.x series: GitHub 4.4.3 Changelog
5.0.0	September 1, 2021	First release of the 5.x series: GitHub 5.0.0 Changelog
5.6.4	November 28, 2023	Last release of the 5.x series: GitHub 5.6.4 Changelog
6.0.0	August 28, 2023	First release of the 6.x series: GitHub 6.0.0 Changelog
6.6.7	February 18, 2025	Last release of the 6.x series: GitHub 6.6.7 Changelog
7.0.0	October 23, 2024	First release of the 7.x series: GitHub 7.0.0 Changelog
7.10.1	August 6, 2026	Last release of the 7.x series: GitHub 7.10.1 Changelog
8.0.0	August 12, 2026	First release of the 8.x series; requires PHP 8.5 or later: GitHub 8.0.0 Changelog
