= Clementine (software) =

Free and open source audio player

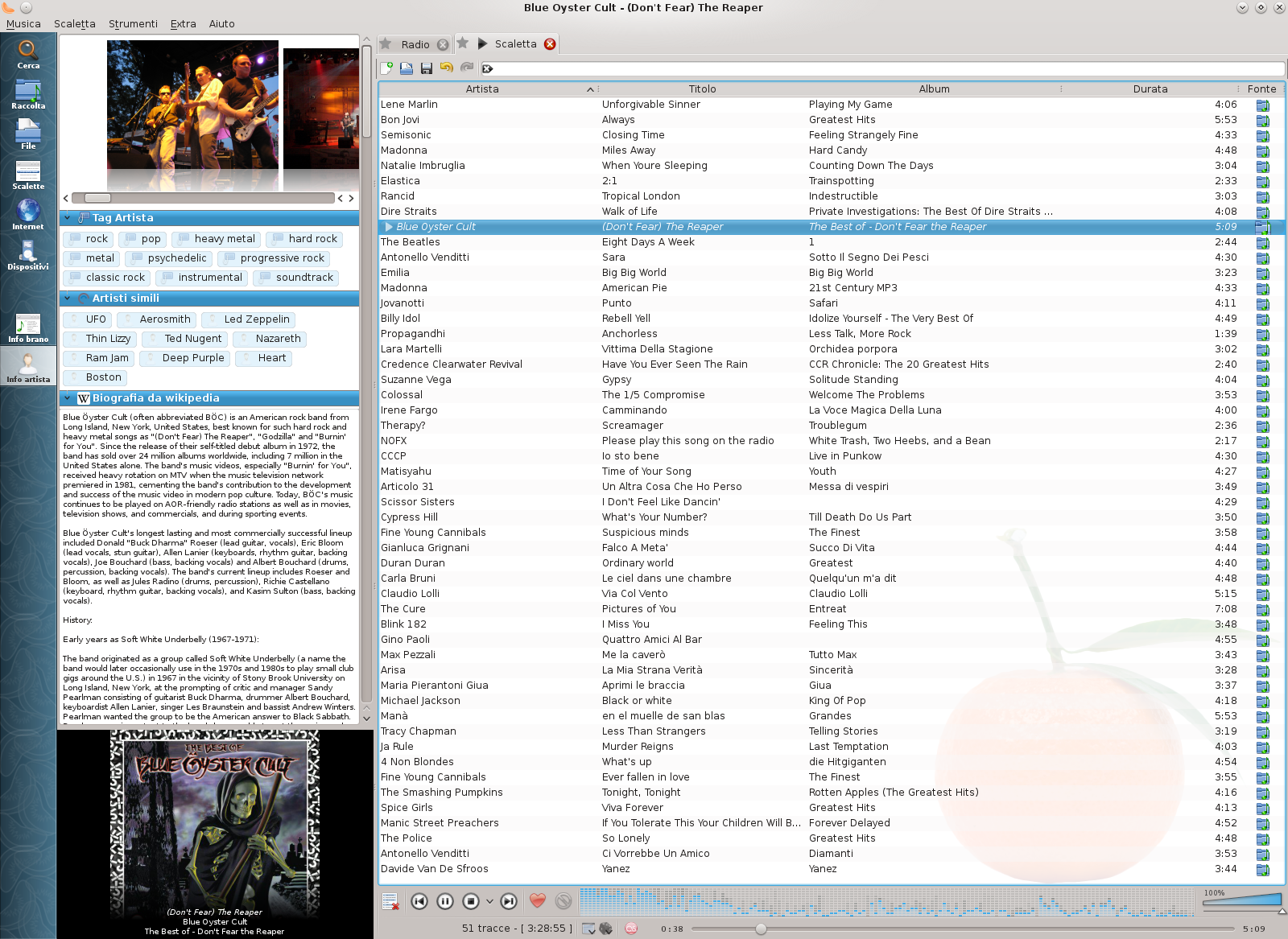
- Clementine running in Debian
- Original authors: David Sansome, John Maguire
- Developers: Paweł Bara, Arnaud Bienner
- Release: February, 2010
- Stable release: 1.4.1-76 / 25 April 2026
- Written in: C++ (Qt)
- Operating system: Windows, macOS, Linux
- Size: Windows: 21 MB macOS: 31 MB; Unix-like: 6 MB
- Available in: English, Igbo
- Type: Audio player
- License: GPL-3.0-or-later
- Website: www.clementine-player.org
- Repository: github.com/clementine-player/Clementine

Clementine is a free and open-source audio player. It is a port of Amarok 1.4 to the Qt 4 framework and the GStreamer multimedia framework. It is available for Unix-like, Windows, and macOS operating systems. Clementine is released under the terms of the GPL-3.0-or-later.

Clementine was created due to the transition from version 1.4 to version 2 of Amarok, and the shift of focus connected with it, which was criticized by many users. The first version of Clementine was released in February 2010.

The last stable release of Clementine was in 2016, but development has since resumed on GitHub, with a number of release candidate versions published. On 15 October 2024, the first non-RC release since 2016 was published.

In 2018, a fork of Clementine named Strawberry Music Player was released. It includes some differences such as being compatible with Qt 6, more focus on local music playback, playback of high-resolution audio sources (HD audio) without resampling and fewer dependencies on libraries and third-party code.

Clementine was originally called Tangerine, named after the Led Zeppelin song, but was renamed to avoid confusion with another piece of software which had the same name.

== Features ==
Clementine can stream audio from services such as Spotify, SoundCloud, Last.fm, and other platforms. The software also has the functionality to display information such as lyrics and statistics regarding the song currently being played, as well as mimicking iTunes functionality by interacting with users' iPod players.

Some additional features supported by Clementine are:

- Tag editor, album cover and queue manager.
- Fetch missing tags from MusicBrainz.
- Project audio visualization.
- Search and download podcasts.
- Creation of smart and dynamic playlists.
- Tabbed playlists, import and export as M3U, XSPF, PLS, ASX and Cue sheets.
- Transcoding music into MP3, Ogg (Vorbis, Speex, Opus), FLAC, AAC or WMA.
- Playback of Windows Media Files in macOS (which iTunes and many other players cannot do).
- Remote control using an Android device, a Wii Remote, MPRIS or the command-line interface.
- Moodbar visualizations.
- Save statistics to file.

== See also ==
- List of free software for audio § Players
