= Exaile =

Open source audio player

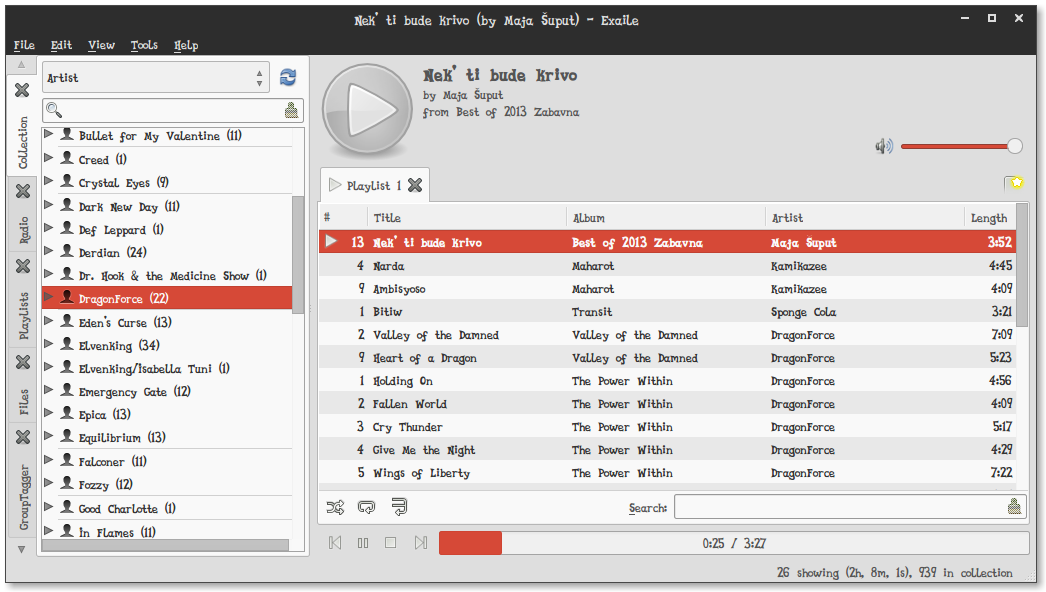
- Screenshot of Exaile 3.4.3
- Original author(s): Adam Olsen
- Developer(s): Dustin Spicuzza, Johannes Sasongko, Mathias Brodala
- Stable release: 4.1.3 / 3 August 2023; 19 months ago
- Preview release: 4.0.0 RC 5 (May 25, 2019; 5 years ago) [±]
- Repository: github.com/exaile/exaile
- Written in: Python (PyGObject) and GTK Widget toolkit
- Operating system: Linux; macOS; Unix-like; Windows
- Type: Audio player
- License: GPL-2.0-or-later
- Website: exaile.org

Exaile is a cross-platform free and open-source audio player, tag editor and library organizer. It was originally conceived to be similar in style and functions to KDE's Amarok 1.4, but uses the GTK widget toolkit rather than Qt. It is written in Python and utilizes the GStreamer media framework.

Exaile incorporates many features from Amarok (and other media players) like automatic fetching of album art, handling of large libraries, lyrics fetching, Last.fm support, advanced tag editing, and optional iPod and MSC device support via plugins.

Compared to typical music players, Exaile is able to handle large music libraries without requiring a massive importing of all music files into its own organizational structure. To facilitate this, Exaile allows users to organize their music library in a wide variety of ways, such as by tags, group tags, smart playlists, genre, storage location, and more.

In addition, Exaile supports plugins that provide features such as ReplayGain support, an equalizer with presets, previewing tracks via a secondary soundcard, and Moodbar integration.

== See also ==
- Quod Libet
- Comparison of free software for audio § Players
