= Digital Audio Control Protocol =

Remote control protocol for audio players

Digital Audio Control Protocol (DACP) is a protocol used by iTunes and other audio player and server applications on Mac, Windows and Linux computers, enabling remote control by mobile devices such as iPhone and Android phones and tablet computers. By connecting the personal computer to loudspeakers the mobile device is used as a two-way remote control, allowing selection and control of music playback within a traditional listening environment such as a home or apartment.

== Clients ==
Compliant DACP clients can connect to any DACP enabled server. Clients are available for multiple desktop and mobile platforms.

Apple Remote
Apple Remote is the first DACP client created specifically for iTunes remote control.

CuteRemote
CuteRemote DACP remote control for Nokia Phones.

TunesRemote+
TunesRemote+ for Google Android is a fork of Jeff Sharkey's TunesRemote project. The project's goal is provide remote functionality for Android with similar capabilities as Apple's remote.

TunesRemote-SE
TunesRemote-SE combines the DACP control software from TunesRemote+ with the graphical user interface from Firefly Client to produce an application that can control a DACP server from any computer running Java.

Remote for iTunes
Remote for iTunes by Hyperfine Software for Android lets users control iTunes via their home Wi-Fi network.

Remote for Windows Phone 7
Remote for Windows Phone 7 by Komodex Software lets users control DACP servers from their home Wi-Fi network.

yTrack
yTrack is an iPad application developed by Fabrice Dewasmes that browses a remote DACP library and let users control it.

Name	Platform	Developer	Status
Apple Remote	iPad, iPhone, iPod	Apple Inc.	active
CuteRemote+	Symbian and Nokia N9	Tero Siironen	active
TunesRemote+	Google Android	Google Code Project	active
TunesRemote-SE	Java	Nick Glass	active
Remote for iTunes	Google Android	Hyperfine Software	active
Remote for Windows Phone 7	Windows Phone 7	Komodex Software	active
yTrack	iPad	Fabrice Dewasmes	active

== Servers ==
Compliant DACP servers can accept connections from any DACP client. Multiple compliant servers are available for Mac, Windows and Linux platforms.

Apple iTunes
Apple iTunes is the original DACP server and the specification was created specifically for iTunes remote control.

MonkeyTunes for MediaMonkey
In 2009 Melloware Inc., released MonkeyTunes, the first known "third-party" DACP server for MediaMonkey that is fully compliant with Apple's DACP protocol.

TouchRemote for Foobar2000
In 2009 Wintense released TouchRemote, a plugin (component) for the foobar2000 music player, implementing a DACP server that is fully compliant with Apple's DACP protocol allowing Apple Inc.'s Remote application to be used.

AlbumPlayer
In 2011 Albumon, released a DACP plugin for their software AlbumPlayer which is a full featured jukebox player for the PC.

Telescope for Songbird
In 2010 Wilco released Telescope for the Songbird music player, implementing a DACP server that is fully compliant with Apple's DACP protocol, and a standard web service and mobile browser interface.

Rhythmbox for GNOME
In 2010 native DACP support was added to Rhythmbox after a Google Summer of Code project by Alexandre Rosenfeld.

Name	Platform	Developer	Status
iTunes	Mac, Win	Apple Inc.	active
MonkeyTunes for MediaMonkey	Win	Melloware Inc.	active
AlbumPlayer	Win	Albumon	active
TouchRemote	Win	Wintense	active
Telescope	Mac, Win	Wilco	active
Rhythmbox	Linux	Alexandre Rosenfeld	active

== See also ==
- Digital Audio Access Protocol
- Remote Audio Output Protocol
