= O2 Joggler =

2009 tablet computer by OpenPeak

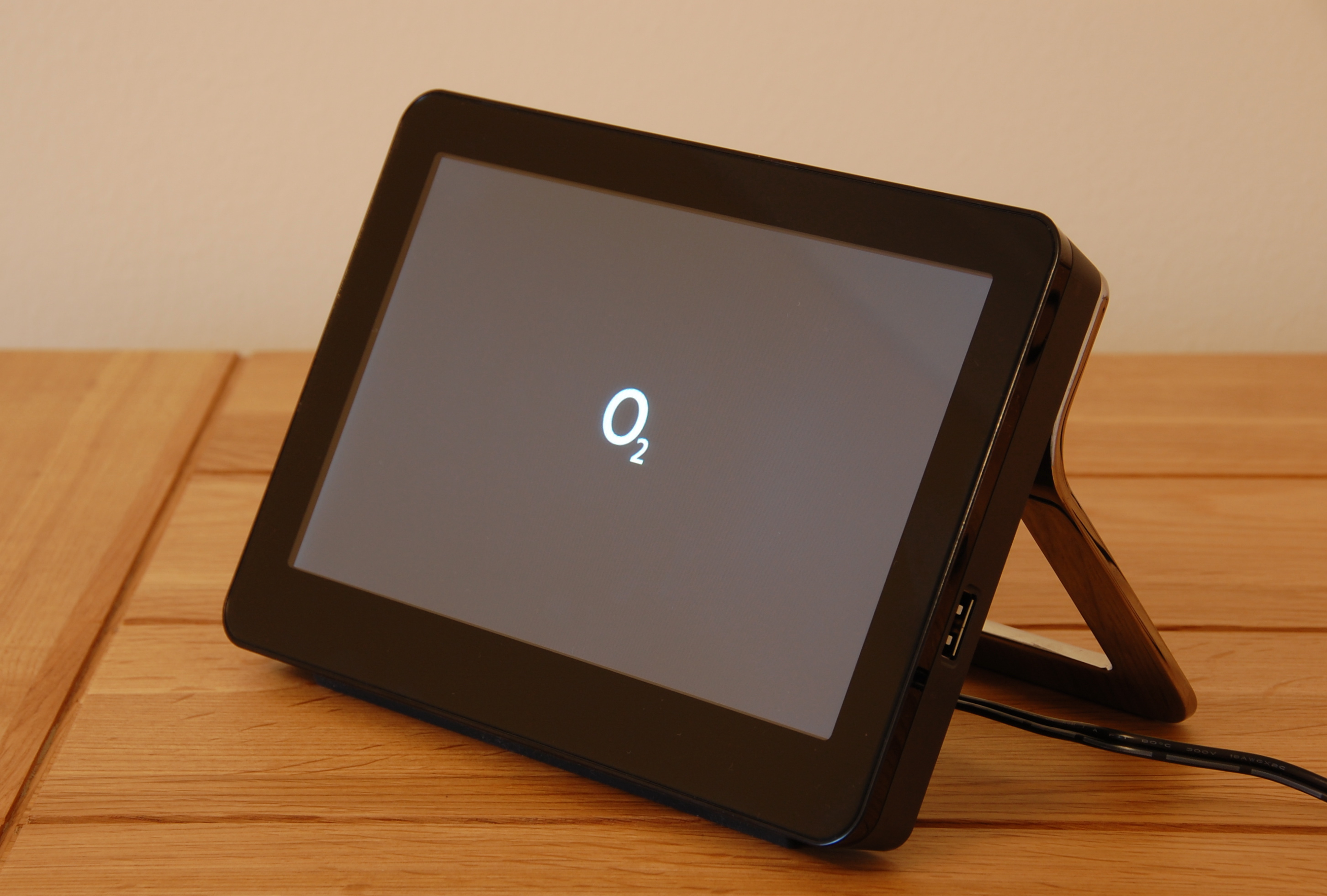
- Manufacturer: OpenPeak
- Type: 'Picture frame' tablet format
- Released: April 2009
- Introductory price: £149.99
- Operating system: Customised Ubuntu 8.04 (Hardy); Firmware: 8964; Software: 30291; Released April 30, 2012
- CPU: 1.3GHz Intel Atom Z520 (single core, two threads)
- Memory: 512MB
- Storage: Internal 1GB Flash
- Display: 7" Sharp LQ070Y3LG4A capacitive touchscreen (single touch)
- Graphics: Intel GMA500 (Hardware accelerated H.264, MPEG2, MPEG4, VC1, WMV9)
- Sound: Internal stereo speakers, 3.5mm stereo jack
- Connectivity: Wi-Fi (2.4GHz 802.11b / 802.11g / 802.11n); 10/100/1000 Ethernet
- Power: 5V, 4000mA DC
- Dimensions: 180 x 130 x 115mm
- Weight: 700g

The O2 Joggler is a computing appliance which was sold by O2 in the United Kingdom. Manufactured by OpenPeak and based on their OpenFrame product, the Joggler's main selling point was its shared calendar application and was aimed at organising family life. It was marketed under the slogan "Your new fridge door".

Launched in April 2009, the Joggler was met with mixed reviews, largely praising the hardware and its potential, but critical of the software and focus of the device. The Joggler's launch price of £149.99 was cut to £99.99 by November 2009, with a radio feature added in association with Pure Digital.

After a year on the market the App Shop was launched, and the price was dropped again to £49.99. Although touted as a special offer, this price was maintained until remaining stock was depleted. The low cost, combined with the high quality components and dissatisfaction in the software, has fostered a hacker community, and there are now a number of new applications and operating systems available for the device.

During April and May 2012, users running the official operating system received a 'sunset update' which removed all O2 branded applications - including the internet radio, the shared calendar, the ability to send text messages, and two more of the six reasons O2 originally gave to buy one - but expanded the number of installed apps. Once the new firmware is applied, O2 will no longer offer technical support.

O2 acknowledged the work of the hacker community in their web page describing the update.

== Hardware ==
The Joggler shares many external similarities with a digital photo frame, consisting of a 7" screen with black border, dark grey plastic rear shell, integral rubber foot and chromed stand. The stand inclines the screen of the Joggler towards the user, providing a better angle for use. Although a number of promotional images show an O2 logo on the lower portion of the screen border, no production units feature this.

The right-hand side of the rear shell has a socket for a Standard Type A USB connector, while the reverse has power, Ethernet and audio-out sockets positioned below indented O2 Joggler lettering. A small window for the ambient light sensor is centred on the top of the rear shell, while the underside and remainder of the back feature ventilation holes.

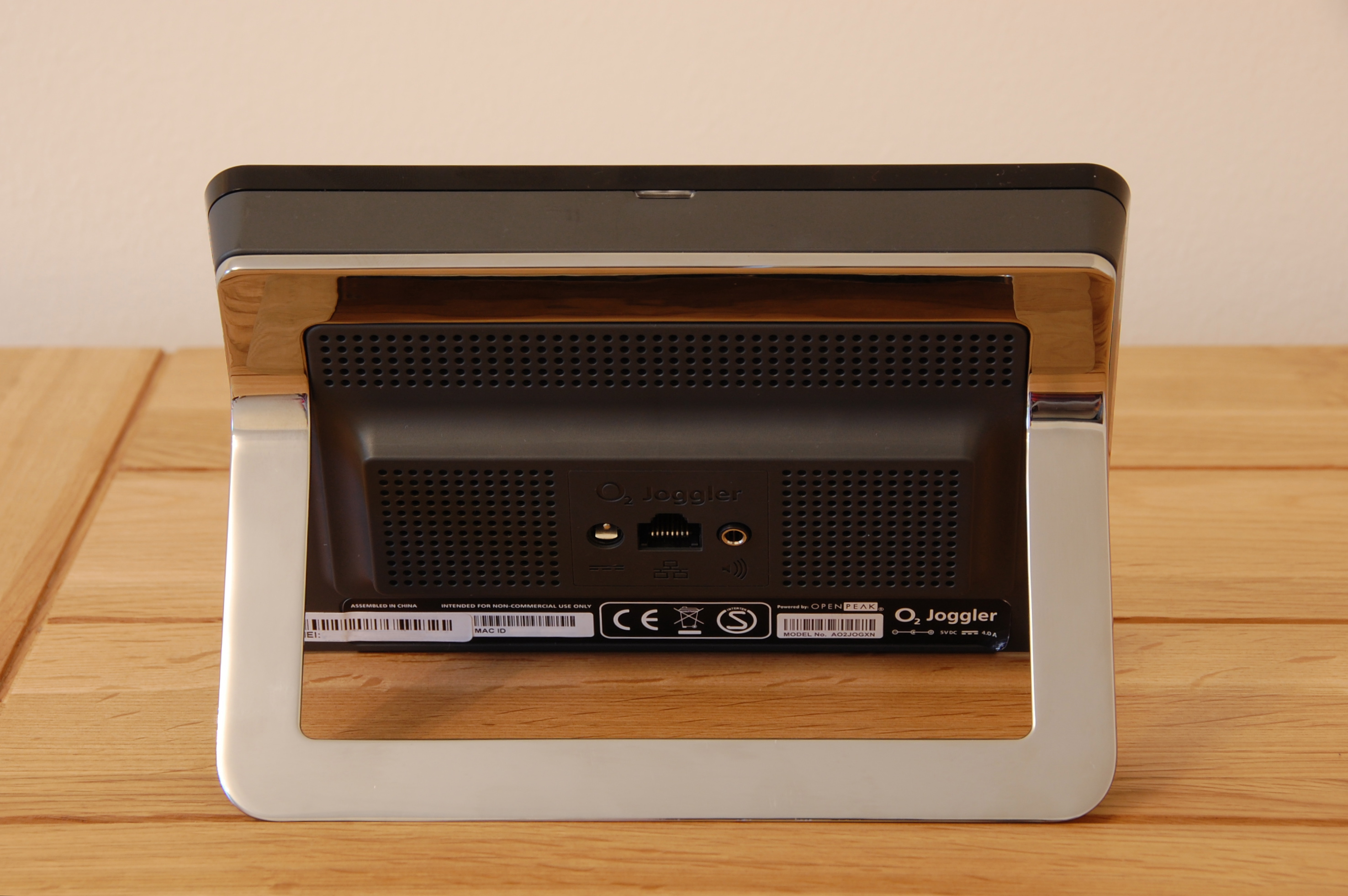
The rear of an O2 Joggler showing power, Ethernet and 3.5 mm audio jack sockets

Display	7" capacitive TFT touch screen (single touch), LED backlight, 800x480 pixel resolution	Datasheet
CPU	Intel Atom Z520 (1.33 GHz, 512KB L2 cache)	Datasheet
GPU	Intel SCH US15W (GMA500) (Poulsbo SCH with hardware H.264/MPEG-4 AVC playback)	Datasheet
RAM	512MB	
Storage	1GB flash (64MB boot, 256MB OS, 256MB backup OS, 450MB general storage)	
Networking (Wired)	Gigabit Ethernet (10/100/1000baseT)	
Networking (Wireless)	Internal Ralink RT2770 USB adapter (802.11b/g/n)	
Audio	Two internal speakers and 3.5mm stereo jack socket	
Power	5V, 4000mA DC (adapter supplied)	

== Software ==
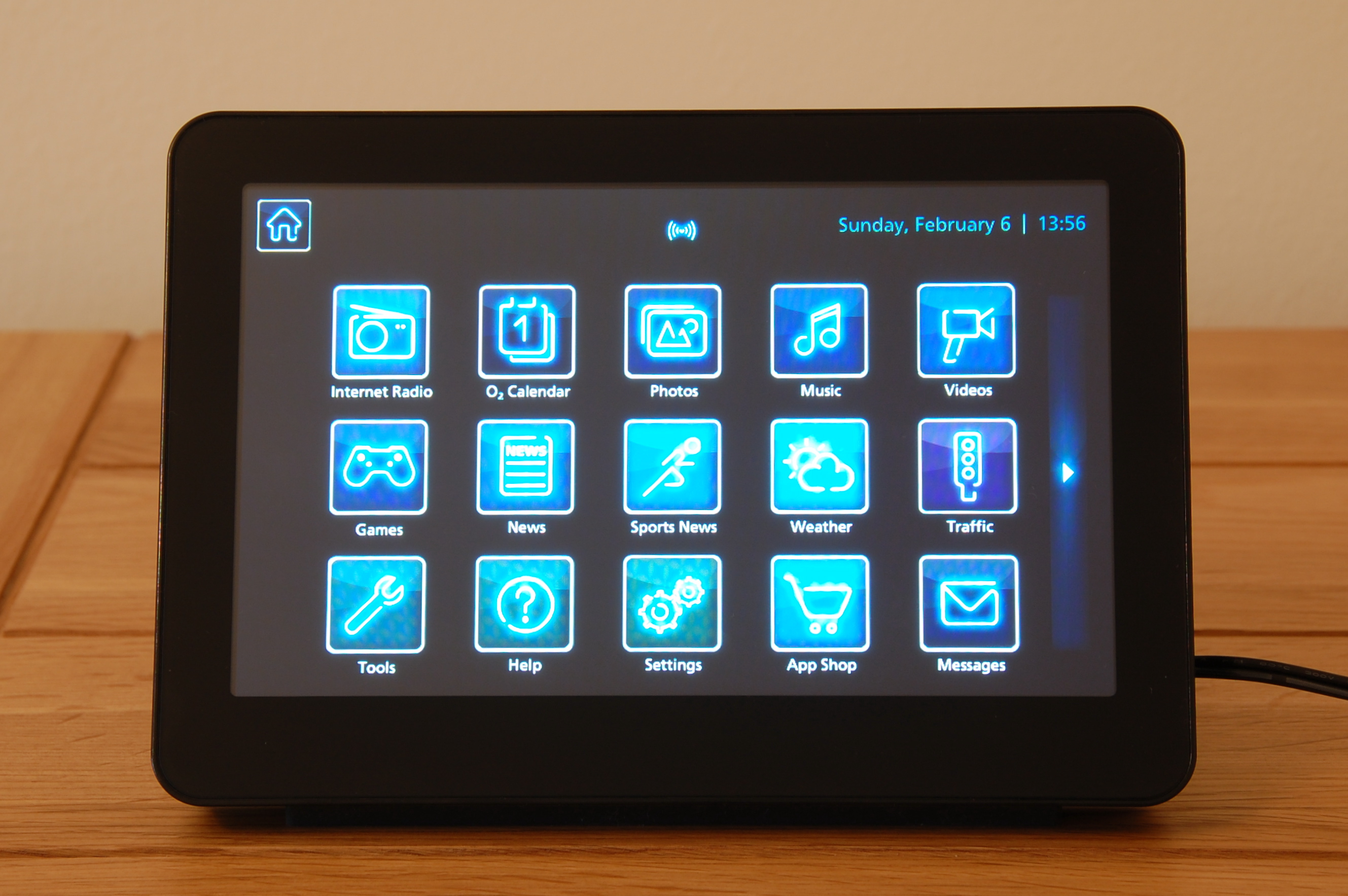
An O2 Joggler displaying the first page of apps under the native OS

A customised Linux operating system based on Ubuntu 8.04 with BusyBox is used for the native interface. This was created by OpenPeak and branded for O2. On 1 April 2010, O2 launched the Joggler App Shop consisting of 13 additional applications including Google Maps, Google Calendar and YouTube. All of these additional applications were free and no further apps were added to the shop before its closure.

All official applications are written in Adobe Flash, a technique similar to that employed on the Chumby device.

When powered on, the device's EFI software displays a splash screen consisting of either the O2 logo or, less commonly, the OpenPeak logo on earlier revisions. Once booting from the 1GB internal storage has been successful a short Flash video is played, displaying an animated O2 logo on blue background. If this is the first boot, the user is asked for some registration details; otherwise the main interface is displayed.

The interface consists of a home button, the date and time, a Wi-Fi indicator (if connected wirelessly) and app buttons arranged in three rows of five. If more than 15 applications are installed a scroll button is displayed, allowing the user to access the additional buttons. Additional notification icons can be displayed to the right of the home button, such as a musical note indicating that the radio app is playing in the background.

After the 'sunset update', O2 applications and branding were removed from the Joggler's operating system, replaced by the generic OpenPeak OS which features on other OpenFrame devices.
