= Magnatune =

American independent record label

- Logo used from 2003-2013
- Founded: 2003
- Founder: John Buckman
- Country of origin: U.S.
- Location: Berkeley, California
- Official website: www.magnatune.com

Magnatune is an American independent record label based in Berkeley, California, founded in spring 2003. It only sold music for download through its website but added a print-CD-on-demand service in late 2004 and in September 2007 began selling complete albums and individual tracks through Amazon.com. In May 2008, Magnatune launched all-you-can-eat membership plans. From March 2010 Magnatune dropped the CD printing service and moved exclusively to all-you-can-eat membership plans. Magnatune was the first record label to license music online and as of May 2015 had sold over 7,000 licenses in its twelve years of existence.

In 2024, Magnatune announced that it was no longer offering new subscriptions or licenses, or trading of any kind. However, some music would still be available for free, via its site to listen to.

== Overview ==
Magnatune makes non-exclusive agreements with artists and gives them 50% of any proceeds from online sales or licensing. These kinds of policies were very unusual for a record label in 2003–2004. Users can stream or download music in MP3 format (no DRM) without charge before choosing whether to buy or not. (Some MP3s available for free download have Magnatune advertisements in them.) Buyers used to be able to purchase individual albums and choose their own price, from US$5 to $18 per album, but in March 2010 Magnatune moved to a subscriptions-only business model, where buyers have to purchase a monthly subscription (with a three-month minimum) under which they can download as much music as they like from Magnatune. Customers may download music they have purchased in WAV, FLAC, MP3, Ogg Vorbis and AAC encoding formats. Music files sold by Magnatune do not use any form of digital rights management to prevent customers from making copies of music files they have purchased; Magnatune encourages buyers to share up to three copies with friends.

All of the tracks downloaded free of charge are licensed under the Creative Commons Attribution-NonCommercial-ShareAlike License. Even though using liberal licensing is not a new idea in itself, Magnatune is one of the first companies to try to build a business in music around this idea.

=== Founder ===
John Buckman is founder of Magnatune. In 1994, Buckman and his ex-wife Jan Hanford founded Lyris Technologies. Buckman was CEO and primary programmer of Lyris' product line: Lyris ListServer, MailShield, and MailEngine. He sold the company in June 2005. In August 2006, he launched the for-profit corporation BookMooch, an online community for the exchange of used books, which—in combination with his work with Magnatune—has associated Buckman with the Free Culture movement. In September 2007, he was elected to the Board of Directors of the Electronic Frontier Foundation and in February 2010 was appointed chairman of the board. In April 2015 Buckman launched Decent Espresso, a company that is designing a new home espresso machine.

Buckman is the co-author of an article in SysAdmin Magazine (later acquired by Dr. Dobbs) entitled "Which OS is Fastest for High-Performance Network Applications?" and the author of an article in Linux Journal entitled "Magnatune, an Open Music Experiment."

== Integration with media players ==
Magnatune has an XML API that has made integration within media players possible. Amarok (from version 1.4.4, released in October 2006) allows users to preview and buy music from all signed artists from within the application. Rhythmbox 0.9.7 added this functionality in December 2006. A Slim Devices plugin for Logitech Media Server is available. A plugin for Songbird is also available. Clementine added support for Magnatune in version 0.4.

== See also ==
- List of record labels
- Jamendo
