= Amarok (software) =

Free and open source music player

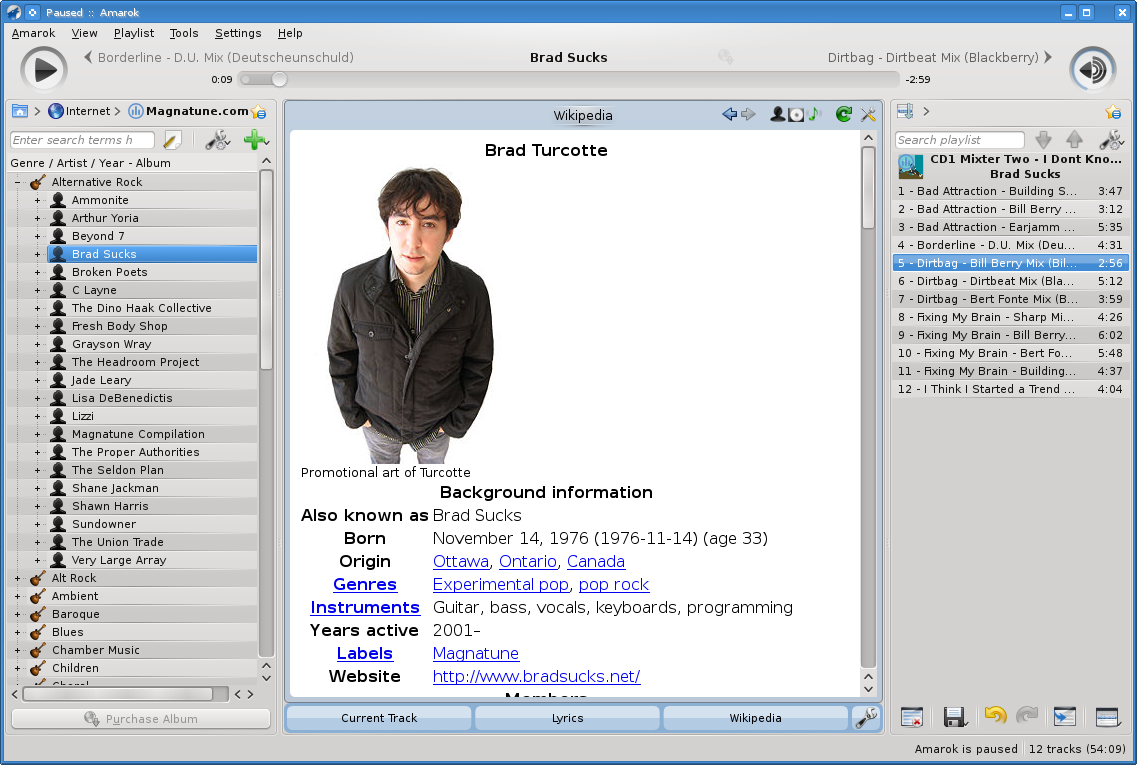
- Amarok 2.3.0 with information retrieved from Wikipedia
- Original author: Mark Kretschmann
- Developer: KDE
- Release: June 23, 2003; 23 years ago
- Stable release: 3.3.2 / 18 January 2026
- Written in: C++ (Qt)
- Operating system: Unix-like, Windows, MacOS
- Type: Audio player
- License: GPL-2.0-or-later
- Website: amarok.kde.org
- Repository: invent.kde.org/multimedia/amarok

Amarok is a free and open-source music player for Linux, macOS, Windows, and other Unix-like operating systems. Amarok is part of the KDE project, but it is released independently of the central KDE Software Compilation release cycle. Amarok is released under the terms of the GPL-2.0-or-later.

== History ==
Amarok is one of the oldest Linux music players in active development, being started in 2003. The program was originally stylized as amaroK, after a Mike Oldfield album of the same name. The artwork references Amarok, a wolf in Inuit mythology. The app's capitalization was changed to Amarok in June 2006.

A new major version of Amarok, version 2.0, was released on December 12, 2008. On June 3, 2009, version 2.1 was released, which reintroduced some of the 1.4 features which had been missing from the initial 2.0 release, and introduced some features such as native ReplayGain support.

Version 3.0 of Amarok was released in April 2024, after a six year hiatus of major updates. It ported the application to Qt5 and added support for FFmpeg 5, along with other smaller changes. A port to Qt6, the newest version of the Qt library, is scheduled for later in the year.

== Features ==
Amarok supports a wide variety of music formats due to the use of audio engines. It can retrieve cover art information and lyrics from the internet It includes a sidebar that displays the user's music collection, saved playlists, and internet radio stations on the left and the active playlist on the right. Amarok can also display the Wikipedia entry for the band or album in the sidebar. Other features include dynamic playlists, bookmarking, file tracking, and smooth fade-out settings.

Amarok includes integration with online music services such as Last.fm, OPML Podcast, Jamendo, Magnatune, and Ampache.

Amarok can be used to manage music on iPods and other MP3 players.

== Notable forks ==
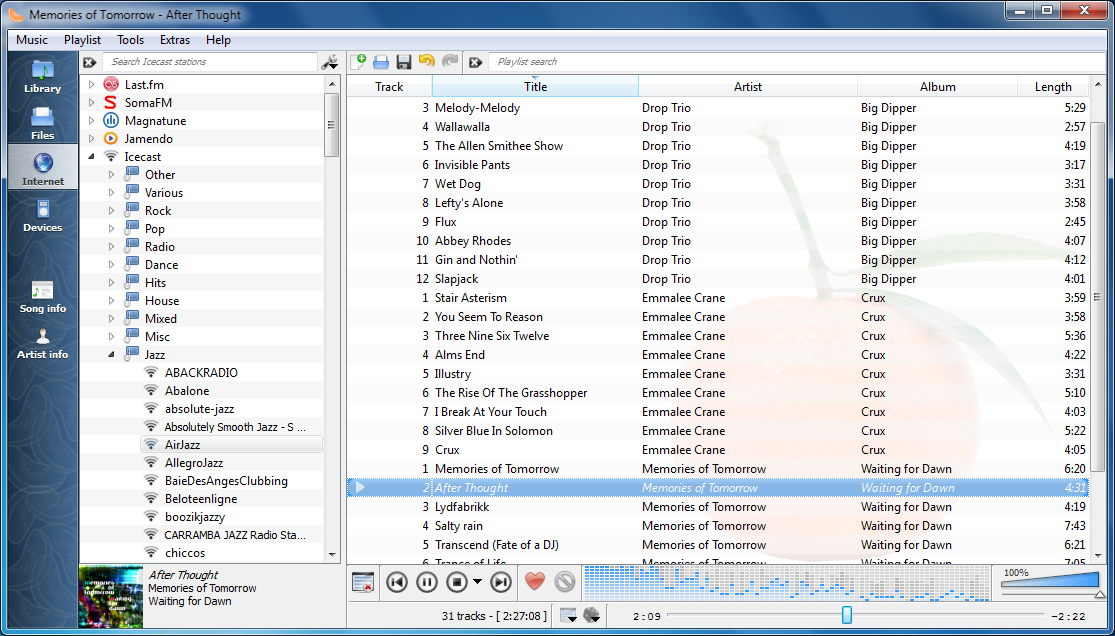
Clementine: A fork of Amarok 1.4.

- Clementine is a fork of Amarok 1.4 that ported it to the Qt 4 framework.
- Strawberry is a fork of Clementine with additional improvements and fixes, first appeared during a period when Clementine development had paused.
- Exaile is a GTK+ fork of Amarok 1.4.
