= The Beechfields Record Label =

- Founded: 2003
- Founder: Michael Nestor, Austin Stahl
- Status: Inactive
- Genre: Indie folk, indie pop
- Country of origin: United States
- Location: Baltimore, Maryland
- Official website: thebeechfields.com

The Beechfields Record Label was an American independent not-for-profit musician's cooperative record label, from Baltimore, Maryland, noted for an artist-centered approach to releasing records.

== History ==
The philosophy that defined the Beechfields was developed by Michael Nestor, at the University of Maryland, Baltimore County in 2000, and the label was officially started in Baltimore in 2003, while Nestor was at the University of Maryland School of Medicine. The Beechfields was designed as a reaction to the suppression of underground music by both major and independent labels. The musical and artistic outlook of the label was based on Virginia label Simple Machines, founded by Jenny Toomey. In 2004, Michael Nestor was joined by local Baltimore musician Austin Stahl, and both Nestor and Stahl produced, or played on the majority of the label's early releases. Originally centering on music traditionally categorized as "lo-fi indie pop," the Beechfields began releasing well produced indie records in 2005, which gained the label local and national notoriety. The Beechfields used that new platform to extend from releasing quality music to teaching musicians how to produce and assemble quality records on their own. In a 2011 interview with Splice Today, Nestor notes "I look back and I'm proud, knowing that many of the things people love about our local scene, and many of the bands they like, are there because of the hard work of myself, my friends, and other like-minded people." Nestor has given a number of lectures and symposia on starting an artist-centered approach to releasing records.

The City Paper notes the Beechfields Record Label "seemed to grow from just another Baltimore indie imprint with a couple bands producing the bulk of its discography to a fully formed label." The label was largely active from 2003 to 2011, and had a substantial impact on the Baltimore indie music scene in the early to mid 2000s through a large catalog of releases from bands like Among Wolves, the Jennifers, Small Sur, Private Eleanor and the Seldon Plan. During its tenure, the Beechfields worked with bands outside of Maryland. However, most of the releases by the label kept a strong Baltimore-centered identity, supporting that music scene.

== Bands ==
- Among Wolves
- The Aidenn Trilogy
- Atone
- Brother John
- A Cat Called Cricket
- The Chris and Joylene Show
- Danny Pruitt
- E. Joseph and the Phantom Heart
- Gary B & The Notions
- The Honest Mistakes
- Infinite Honey
- Isinglass
- The Jennifers
- Jason Dove
- Masters of the Universe
- Mike Pursley
- Private Eleanor
- Pupa's Window
- Red Sammy
- The Red Vines
- The Seldon Plan
- The Stalking Horses
- We Read Minds
- Silent Whys
- Small Sur
