= Sound server =

Software that manages audio devices

A sound server is software that manages the use of and access to audio devices (usually a sound card). It commonly runs as a background process.

== Sound server in an operating system ==
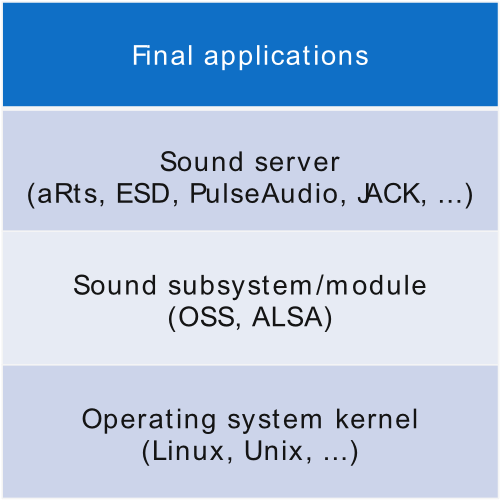
Description of layers that uses a Sound Server

In a Unix-like operating system, a sound server mixes different data streams (usually raw PCM audio) and sends out a single unified audio to an output device. The mixing is usually done by software, or by hardware if there is a supported sound card.

=== Layers ===
The "sound stack" can be visualized as follows, with programs in the upper layers calling elements in the lower layers:

- Applications (e.g. mp3 player, web video)
- Sound server (e.g. aRts, ESD, JACK, PulseAudio, PipeWire)
- Sound subsystem (described as kernel modules or drivers; e.g. OSS, ALSA)
- Operating system kernel (e.g. Linux, Unix)

=== Motivation ===
Sound servers appeared in Unix-like operating systems after limitations in Open Sound System were recognized. OSS is a basic sound interface that was incapable of playing multiple streams simultaneously, dealing with multiple sound cards, or streaming sound over the network.

A sound server can provide these features by running as a daemon. It receives calls from different programs and sound flows, mixes the streams, and sends raw audio out to the audio device.

With a sound server, users can also configure global and per-application sound preferences.

=== Diversification and problems ===
As of 2012 there are multiple sound servers; some focus on providing very low latency, while others concentrate on features suitable for general desktop systems. While diversification allows a user to choose just the features that are important to a particular application, it also forces developers to accommodate these options by necessitating code that is compatible with the various sound servers available. Consequently, this variety has resulted in a desire for a standard API to unify efforts.

In 2017, PipeWire began incorporating audio support, and would then go on to realize that unification for the most part.

== List of sound servers ==
- aRts
- Enlightened Sound Daemon
- JACK
- Network Audio System
- PipeWire
- PulseAudio
- sndio - OpenBSD audio and MIDI framework

=== Streaming ===
- Icecast
- SHOUTcast
