= Libcanberra =

Implementation of the freedesktop.org name and sound theme specifications

libcanberra is a free and open-source implementation of the freedesktop.org name and sound theme specifications. It supports several backends, including ALSA, PulseAudio, OSS, and GStreamer. It is named after Canberra, the capital city of Australia.
