= Dup (system call) =

In Unix-like operating systems, dup (short for "duplicate") and dup2 system calls create a copy of a given file descriptor. This new descriptor actually does not behave like a copy, but like an alias of the old one.

== C library POSIX definition ==
The dup() and dup2() calls are standardized by the POSIX specification. Similar(following the logic) to pointers, the new file description is merely an alias to the old one, with both file descriptors being capable of being used interchangeably. Both file descriptors in a dup() system call refer to the same open file description which means they share file offset and file status flags; Similar but not identical to the logic used in pointers, shallow or deep copying or references, changes to the offset on one of the file descriptors changes it for the other file descriptor. When using dup(), the two file descriptors don't share the same file descriptor flags. In the calling process the lowest numbered unused file descriptor will be used for the new file descriptor number. When using the dup2() system call it performs the same task as dup() with the exception of using the file descriptor number specified in the newfd variable of the call, in that newfd is adjusted to refer to the oldfd file description. The last system call in this family of functions is dup3(), which is the same as dup2() except that if oldfd equals newfd the system call fails with error EINVAL and the caller can force the close-on-exec flag to be set by specifying O_CLOEXEC in flags. dup3() was formally added to Linux kernel version 2.6.27 (glibc support is available on version 2.9 and above).

int dup(int oldfd);
int dup2(int oldfd, int newfd);

The former allocates the first available descriptor, just like open() behaves; an alternative way to duplicate a file descriptor to an unspecified place is the fcntl system call with F_DUPFD command.

The latter places the copy into newfd. If newfd is open, it is closed first.

== dup2 for input/output redirection ==
Unix shells use dup2 for input/output redirection. Along with pipe(), it is a tool on which Unix pipes rely.

The following example uses pipe() and dup() in order to connect two separate processes (program1 and program2) using Unix pipes:

#include <stdio.h>
#include <stdlib.h>
#include <unistd.h>

void die(const char msg[]) {
	perror(msg);
	exit(EXIT_FAILURE);
}
 
int main() {
    int pdes[2];

    if (pipe(pdes) == -1) {
        die("pipe()");
    }
 
    pid_t child = fork();
    if (child == (pid_t)(-1)) {
        die("fork() failed");
    }
 
	if (child == (pid_t)0) {
        // child process
        close(STDOUT_FILENO); // close stdout
        if (dup(pdes[1]) == -1) {
            die("dup() failed");
        }
        	
        // now stdout and pdes[1] are equivalent:
        // dup returns lowest free descriptor

        if ((execlp("program1", "program1", "arg1", NULL)) == -1) {
            die("execlp() failed");
        }
	} else {
        // parent process
        close(STDIN_FILENO); // close stdin
        	
        if (dup(pdes[0]) == -1) {
            die("dup() failed");
        }

        // now stdin and pdes[0] are equivalent:
        // dup returns lowest free descriptor

        if ((execlp("program2", "program2", "arg1", NULL)) == -1) {
            die("execlp() failed");
        }
	}
 
	return 0;
}

== See also ==
- File descriptor – how it works and other functions related to open
