= Direct.h =

C header

<direct.h> is a C/C++ header file provided by Microsoft Windows, which contains functions for manipulating file system directories. Some POSIX functions that do similar things are in <unistd.h>.

== Member functions ==
| Name | Action |
|---|---|
| int _chdir(char* path) | Change working directory. |
| int _chdrive(int drive) | Change disk drive. |
| char* _getcwd(char* buffer, size_t length) | Get the current working directory pathname |
| char* _getwd(char* path_name); | Get working directory. |
| int _getdrive(void) | Get disk drive. |
| int _mkdir(const char* pathname) | Make a directory. |
| int _rmdir(const char* pathname) | Remove a directory. |
| void _fnmerge(char* path, const char* drive, const char* dir, const char* name, const char* ext) | Merges drive, dir, name and ext into path. |
| int _fnsplit(const char* path, char* drive, char* dir, char* name, char* ext) | Splits path into drive, dir, name and ext. |
| char* _searchpath(const char* file) | Searches for a file. |

== See also ==
- File system
- Directory structure
