= PortMidi =

PortMidi is a computer library for real time input and output of MIDI data. It is designed to be portable to many different operating systems. PortMidi is part of the PortMusic project.

== See also ==
- PortAudio
