= C-list =

C-list may refer to:

- A category of celebrities, originally referring to Hollywood actors; see A-list
- C-list (computer security), a list of capabilities that a process or protection domain has direct permission to access
- CLIST, a procedural programming language
