= Alsamixer =

Linux audio mixer program

alsamixer
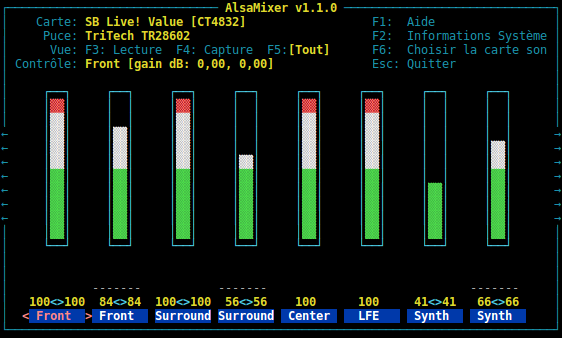
- A screenshot of alsamixer v.1.0.20
- Developers: Jaroslav Kysela, others
- Initial release: August 13, 1998; 27 years ago
- Stable release: 1.2.13 / November 12, 2024; 17 months ago
- Written in: C
- Operating system: Linux
- Type: Audio
- License: GNU General Public License
- Website: www.alsa-project.org

alsamixer is a terminal user interface mixer program for the Advanced Linux Sound Architecture (ALSA) that is used to configure sound settings and adjust the volume. It uses ncurses to draw its user interface. It supports multiple sound cards with multiple devices.

== See also ==
- Aplay
- Softvol
