= Wim Taymans =

Belgian software developer

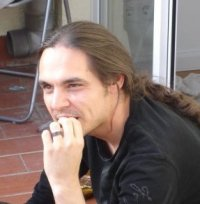
- Born: 21 June 1972 (age 54)
- Occupation: Lead Software Designer
- Notable work: PipeWire

Wim Odilia Georges Taymans (born 21 June 1972) is a Belgian software developer based in Spain. He is the original developer behind GStreamer and PipeWire technologies, which provide core multimedia processing capabilities to many modern operating systems.

Taymans started his career in multimedia development on the Commodore 64 and the Amiga writing various games and demos. In 1994 he installed the Linux operating system on his Amiga and has since been involved with the development of various multimedia technologies for the Linux platform. His first efforts on Linux were some assembly optimizations for the rtjpeg library; later, he worked on the Trinity video editor before teaming up with Erik Walthinsen to create the GStreamer multimedia framework.

In 2004 he started working for Fluendo in Spain as employee number 3. While working for Fluendo he designed and wrote most of the 0.10 release series of GStreamer. In July 2007 he left Fluendo and joined with Collabora. As part of his job at Collabora he maintained and developed GStreamer further. In November 2013, Taymans started as a Principal Software Engineer at Red Hat spending most of his time working on upstream GStreamer.

Taymans was the main architect and developer behind the GStreamer 1.0 release which came out on 24 September 2012.

In July 2015, Taymans announced that he was designing Pinos, which became PipeWire, from his position as Principal Engineer at Red Hat. PipeWire is a server for handling audio and video streams on Linux.
