= Softvol =

Softvol is an Advanced Linux Sound Architecture (ALSA) plugin that adds a software based volume control to the ALSA audio mixer (alsamixer). This is helpful when a sound card does not have a hardware volume control. The softvol plugin is built into ALSA and does not require separate installation.

Another use case of softvol is when a hardware volume control is unable to amplify the sound beyond certain threshold and thus renders an audio file too quiet. In this case software amplifiers can be used in order to boost the volume level at the price of sacrificing some quality.

Many modern programs that are able to play audio files have their own, sound system-independent software volume controls.
