= PortMedia =

Set of open source computer libraries

PortMedia, formerly PortMusic, is a set of open source computer libraries for dealing with sound and MIDI. Currently, the project has two main libraries: PortAudio, for digital audio input and output, and PortMidi, a library for MIDI input and output. A library for dealing with different audio file formats, PortSoundFile, is being planned, although another library, libsndfile, already exists and is licensed under the copyleft GNU Lesser General Public License. A standard MIDI file I/O library, PortSMF, is under construction.

PortMusic has become PortMedia and is hosted on SourceForge.

== See also ==
- List of free software for audio
