= FFADO =

Project to provide open-source drivers

- Stable release: 2.5.0 / January 6, 2026; 8 months ago
- Written in: C++ and Python
- Operating system: Linux
- Type: Software driver
- License: GNU GPL
- Website: ffado.org

Free FireWire Audio Drivers (FFADO) is a project to provide open-source drivers for FireWire sound interfaces on Linux. The project was initially known as FreeBoB, a driver specifically for FireWire audio devices based on technology made by BridgeCo, which use an interface named BeBoB The current version provides a way for such devices to be accessed via the JACK Audio Connection Kit (JACK).

Following a presentation of a paper at the 2007 Linux Audio Conference outlining the future of the project, on March 26, 2007, it was announced that the project would be renamed to FFADO, as the drivers are being rewritten to include support for other FireWire audio chipsets.
