= Aplay =

aplay is a command-line audio file player for the ALSA sound card driver. It supports several file formats and multiple sound cards with multiple devices. For supported soundfile formats, the sampling rate, bit depth, and so forth can be automatically determined from the soundfile header.

== Example ==
aplay -c 1 -t raw -r 22050 -f mu_law foobar

Will play the raw file "foobar" as a 22050-Hz, mono, 8-bit, mu-law .au file.
