= C-list (computer security) =

In capability-based computer security, a C-list is an array of capabilities, usually associated with a process and maintained by the kernel. The program running in the process does not manipulate capabilities directly, but refers to them via C-list indexes—integers indexing into the C-list.

The file descriptor table in Unix is an example of a C-list. Unix processes do not manipulate file descriptors directly, but refer to them via file descriptor numbers, which are C-list indexes.

In the KeyKOS and EROS operating systems, a process's capability registers constitute a C-list.

== See also ==
- Access-control list
