= Ardour (software) =

Open-source digital audio workstation

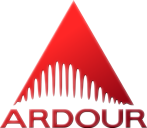

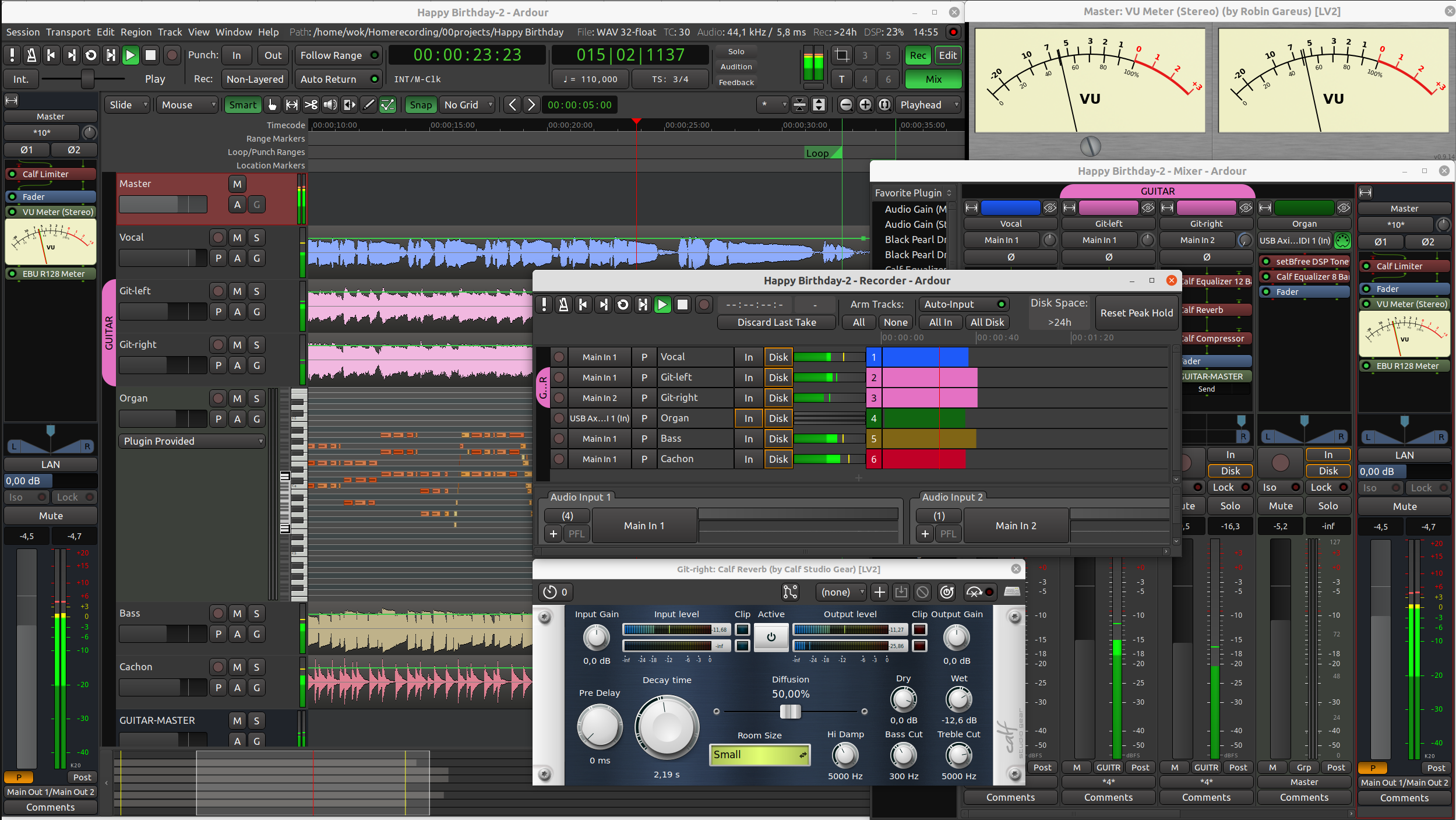
- Screenshot of Ardour 6.7
- Original author: Paul Davis
- Developers: David Robillard, Robin Gareus, Nick Mainsbridge, Colin Fletcher, Ben Loftis, Tim Mayberry
- Release: 23 September 2005; 21 years ago
- Stable release: 9.8 / 23 August 2026; 2 months ago
- Written in: C++ (GTK 2)
- Operating system: FreeBSD, Linux, macOS, Microsoft Windows
- Available in: English
- Type: Digital audio workstation
- License: GPL-2.0-or-later
- Website: ardour.org
- Repository: git.ardour.org/ardour/ardour.git

Ardour is a free and open-source digital audio workstation and hard disk recorder that runs on Linux, macOS, FreeBSD and Microsoft Windows. Its primary author is Paul Davis, who is also responsible for the JACK Audio Connection Kit. Released under the GNU General Public License, it is intended to be suitable for professional use.

== Features ==
=== Mixing ===
Ardour supports an arbitrary number of tracks and buses through an "anything to anywhere" routing system. All gain, panning and plug-in parameters can be automated. All sample data is mixed and maintained internally in 32-bit floating point format.

=== Editing ===
Ardour supports dragging, trimming, splitting and time-stretching recorded regions with sample-level resolution, and supports layer regions. It includes a crossfade editor and beat detection, unlimited undo/redo, and a "snapshot" feature for saving the current state of a session to a file.

=== Mastering ===
Ardour can be used as an audio mastering environment. It can also export TOC and CUE files for creating audio CDs.

=== AI functionality ===
Ardour has support for AI-assisted workflows via an MCP server. It allows AI agents to insert and remove audio plug-ins, create and edit MIDI notes and regions, and modify other session information.

== Compatibility ==
Ardour attempts to adhere to industry standards, such as SMPTE/MTC, Broadcast Wave Format, MIDI Machine Control and XML.

It has been tested on Linux, x86-64, x86, PowerPC and ARM (for at least version 3) architectures; Solaris, macOS on Intel and PowerPC, Windows on Intel architectures and FreeBSD. It takes advantage of all of these systems' multiprocessor, multicore SMP and real-time features.

Pre-built binaries of Ardour are available for purchase for Linux, macOS and Windows. It is also possible to build Ardour for free from the freely available source code.

=== Plug-ins ===
Ardour relies on plug-ins for many features, from audio effects processing to dynamic control. It supports the following plugin format and platform combinations: LV2 on Linux, FreeBSD, macOS and Windows; Audio Units on macOS; Steinberg's VST2 on Linux, macOS and Windows; LADSPA on Linux, FreeBSD, macOS and Windows. It is theoretically possible to use plugins created for Windows in the VST2 format on Linux with the help of Wine, but the project team does not recommend it.

=== Import and export ===
Ardour can import audio clips into sessions from many common audio file formats, including WAV, FLAC, Vorbis, AIFF, CAF, W64, BWF and MP3; SMF files are supported for MIDI import.

Ardour can export whole sessions or parts of sessions, and import audio clips into sessions, using its built-in audio file database manager, or directly from an ordinary file browser.

== See also ==
- JACK Audio Connection Kit, a real-time low-latency audio server.
- Comparison of digital audio editors
- Comparison of free software for audio
- Linux audio software
- List of free and open source digital audio workstation software
- List of music software

== Articles ==
- Hinkle-Turner, Elizabeth (September 2009). "Ardour et al., or Free and Easy Laptop Pro Audio: An Essay Perspective from a desperate working mother composer". eContact! 11.3 — Open Source for Audio Application. Canadian Electroacoustic Community.
- Nettingsmeier, Jörn (September 2009). "Ardour and Ambisonics: A FLOSS approach to the next generation of sound spatialisation". eContact! 11.3 - Jörn Nettingsmeier - Ardour and Ambisonics. Canadian Electroacoustic Community.
- Gareus, Robin (December 2017). The Ardour DAW - Latency Compensation and Anywhere-to-Anywhere Signal Routing Systems. PhD Thesis (These de doctorat). Université Paris 8.
