= Open Sound System =

Sound server for Unix-like operating systems

- Original author(s): Hannu Savolainen
- Developer(s): NCR Corporation
- Stable release: 4.2 build 2019 / March 5, 2019; 6 years ago
- Operating system: Cross-platform
- Type: Audio
- License: BSD-2-Clause; CDDL-1.0; GPL-2.0-only; Proprietary (formerly)
- Website: www.opensound.com

The Open Sound System (OSS) is an interface for making and capturing sound in Unix and Unix-like operating systems. It is based on standard Unix devices system calls (i.e. POSIX read, write, ioctl, etc.). The term also sometimes refers to the software in a Unix kernel that provides the OSS interface; it can be thought of as a device driver (or a collection of device drivers) for sound controller hardware. The goal of OSS is to allow the writing of sound-based applications that are agnostic of the underlying sound hardware.

OSS was created by Hannu Savolainen and is distributed under four license options, three of which are free software licences, thus making OSS free software.

== API ==
The API is designed to use the traditional Unix framework of open(), read(), write(), and ioctl(), via device files. For instance, the default device for sound input and output is /dev/dsp. Examples using the shell:

cat /dev/random > /dev/dsp # plays white noise through the speaker
cat /dev/dsp > a.a # reads data from the microphone and copies it to file a.a

OSS implements the /dev/audio interface. Detailed access to individual sound devices is provided via the /dev/oss directory. OSS also has MIDI support in /dev/sequencer, /dev/music (both legacy) and /dev/mini.

On Linux, OSS4 is also able to emulate ALSA, its open-source replacement.

== History ==
OSS was originally "VoxWare", a Linux kernel sound driver by Hannu Savolainen. Savolainen made the code available under free software licenses, GPL for Linux and BSD for BSD distributions. Between November 1993 (and Linux 1.00) and 1997, OSS was the sole choice of sound system in FreeBSD and Linux. This was changed when Luigi Rizzo wrote a new "pcm" driver for FreeBSD in 1997, and when Jaroslav Kysela started Advanced Linux Sound Architecture in 1998.

In 2002, Savolainen was contracted by the company 4Front Technologies and made the upcoming OSS 4, which includes support for newer sound devices and improvements, proprietary. In response, the Linux community abandoned the OSS/free implementation included in the kernel and development effort switched to the replacement Advanced Linux Sound Architecture (ALSA). FreeBSD by this time had switched to a "newpcm" project started in 1999 and was not affected.

In July 2007, 4Front Technologies released sources for OSS under CDDL-1.0 for OpenSolaris and GPL-2.0-only for Linux. Drivers for some soundcards remained closed-source and were not included in the release. In January 2008, 4Front Technologies released OSS for FreeBSD (and other BSD systems) under the BSD-2-Clause.

== Adoption status ==
=== Code ===
OSS4 now exists mostly as a standalone piece of software, not integrated into the kernel source code. The exception is Solaris and OpenSolaris, which use a fork of OSS4 called Boomer. It combines the OSS4 framework (audio and mixer) together with Sun's earlier SADA (/dev/audio) API.

Although Linux distributions such as Ubuntu made OSS4 available as a software package after it was made free software, they have chosen to ignore any bugs filed against these packages.

=== API ===
The OSS API has remained influential despite the obscurity of the original library. NetBSD's documentation describes it as "the preferred API in FreeBSD and Solaris".

FreeBSD contains an independently developed implementation of the OSS API, which includes, among other things, in-kernel resampling, mixing (vchans), equalizer, surround sound, and independent volume control for each application. It also supports bit-perfect mode. It gradually evolved from the "newpcm" replacement written in 1999 and caught up with OSS4 API around 2005.

NetBSD supports a compatibility mode for the OSS API, by providing the soundcard.h header file and the libossaudio library, which internally operate using the native Sun-like audio interface. The replacement was first seen in NetBSD 1.3 of 1998.

Linux had, as aforementioned, switched to Advanced Linux Sound Architecture since 2003 (kernel 2.6). ALSA provides an optional, in-kernel, OSS emulation mode that appears to programs as if it were OSS. ALSA also has a aoss userspace program that works by intercepting systems calls directed to the OSS device files.

== OSS/3D ==
OSS/3D is a plugin for music players, which acts as an audio postprocessing engine. Supported players include Winamp, Windows Media Player (9 or later), musicmatch, Sonique, Foobar2000, JetAudio, XMMS. It is ported to Windows and Linux platforms. Unlike the OSS, it is shareware.

4Front OSS3D was later renamed to Joesoft Hear.

== Criticism ==
OSS both as API and as software has been criticized by some developers, such as Paul Davis (of JACK Audio Connection Kit) and Lennart Poettering (of competing PulseAudio).

== See also ==
- Advanced Linux Sound Architecture – prevailing sound framework in the Linux kernel
- PulseAudio – a sound server for desktop use, commonly used on Linux systems
- JACK Audio Connection Kit – prevailing sound server for professional audio production on Linux
