= PortAudio =

- Original author: Ross Bencina
- Stable release: 19.7.0 / 6 April 2021; 5 years ago
- Written in: C
- Operating system: Cross-platform
- Type: API
- License: MIT License
- Website: www.portaudio.com
- Repository: github.com/PortAudio/portaudio

PortAudio is an open-source computer library for audio playback and recording. It is a cross-platform library, so programs using it can run on many different computer operating systems, including Windows, Mac OS X and Linux. PortAudio supports Core Audio, ALSA, and MME, DirectSound, ASIO and WASAPI on Windows. Like other libraries whose primary goal is portability, PortAudio is written in the C programming language. It has also been implemented in the languages PureBasic and Lazarus/Free Pascal. PortAudio is based on a callback paradigm, similar to JACK and ASIO.

PortAudio is part of the PortMedia project, which aims to provide a set of platform-independent libraries for music software. The free audio editor Audacity uses the PortAudio library, and so does JACK on the Windows platform.

== See also ==
- List of free software for audio
