= Unistd.h =

POSIX C header

In the C and C++ programming languages, <unistd.h> is the name of the header file that provides access to the POSIX operating system API. It is defined by the POSIX.1 standard, the base of the Single Unix Specification, and should therefore be available in any POSIX-compliant operating system and compiler. For instance, this includes Unix and Unix-like operating systems, such as GNU variants, distributions of Linux and BSD, and macOS, and compilers such as GCC and LLVM.

On Unix-like systems, the interface defined by <unistd.h> is typically made up largely of system call wrapper functions such as fork, pipe and I/O primitives (read, write, close, etc.).

Unix compatibility layers such as Cygwin and MinGW also provide their own versions of <unistd.h>. In fact, those systems provide it along with the translation libraries that implement its functions in terms of win32 functions. E.g. In Cygwin, a header file can be found in /usr/include that sub-includes a file of the same name in /usr/include/sys. Not everything is defined in there but some definitions are done by references to the GNU C standard library headers (like <stddef.h>) which provide the type size_t and many more. Thus, <unistd.h> is only a generically defined adaptive layer that might be based upon already existing system and compiler specific definitions. This has the general advantage of not having a possibly concurrent set of header file defined, but one that is built upon the same root which, for this reason, will raise much fewer concerns in combined usage cases.

== Overview of functions ==
	Function	Description
	crypt	password and data encryption
	encrypt	encrypt 64-byte messages
	gethostid	get the unique identifier of the current host
	gethostname	get hostname
	getopt	parse command-line options
	swab	swap adjacent bytes
	sysconf	get configuration at run time
Signals	alarm	schedule an alarm signal
Signals	pause	wait for signal
Filesystem	access faccessat faccessat2	check user's permissions for a file or whether it exists
Filesystem	chdir fchdir	change working directory
Filesystem	chown fchown lchown fchownat	change owner and group of a file
Filesystem	close	close a file descriptor
Filesystem	dup dup2	duplicate a file descriptor
Filesystem	fsync fdatasync	synchronize a file's in-core state with storage device
Filesystem	fpathconf pathconf	get configuration values for files
Filesystem	ftruncate truncate	truncate a file to a specified length
Filesystem	getcwd getwd get_current_dir_name	get current working directory
Filesystem	isatty	test whether a file descriptor refers to a terminal
Filesystem	link linkat	make a new name for a file
Filesystem	lockf	apply, test or remove a POSIX lock on an open file
Filesystem	lseek	reposition read/write file offset
Filesystem	pipe pipe2	create pipe
Filesystem	pread pwrite	read from or write to a file descriptor at a given offset
Filesystem	read	read from a file descriptor
Filesystem	readlink readlinkat	read value of a symbolic link
Filesystem	rmdir	delete a directory
Filesystem	symlink symlinkat	make a new name for a file
Filesystem	sync syncfs	commit filesystem caches to disk
Filesystem	ttyname ttyname_r	return name of a terminal
Filesystem	unlink unlinkat	delete a name and possibly the file it refers to
Filesystem	write	write to a file descriptor
Process	_exit	terminate the calling process
Process	execl execlp execle execv execvp execvpe	execute a file
Process	fexecve	execute program specified via file descriptor
Process	fork	create a new process
Process	setpgid getpgid setpgrp getpgrp	set/get process group
Process	getpid getppid	get process identification
Process	getsid	get session ID
Process	nice	change process priority
Process	setsid	creates a session and sets the process group ID
Process	sleep	sleep for a specified number of seconds
Process	tcgetpgrp tcsetpgrp	get and set terminal foreground process group
User/Group	getgid getegid	get group identity
User/Group	getuid geteuid	get user identity
User/Group	getgroups	get list of supplementary group IDs
User/Group	getlogin getlogin_r	get username
User/Group	seteuid setegid	set effective user or group ID
User/Group	setgid	set group identity
User/Group	setreuid setregid	set real and/or effective user or group ID
User/Group	setuid	set user identity
