= Open (system call) =

System calls in some operating systems

In Unix-like operating systems, a program initializes access to a file in a file system using the open system call. This allocates resources associated to the file (the file descriptor), and returns a handle that the process will use to refer to that file. In some cases, the open is performed by the first access.

The same file may be opened simultaneously by several processes, and even by the same process, resulting in several file descriptors for the same file; depending on the file organization and filesystem. Operations on the descriptors such as moving the file pointer or closing it are independent—they do not affect other descriptors for the same file. Operations on the file, such as a write, can be seen by operations on the other descriptors: a later read can read the newly written data.

During the open, the filesystem may allocate memory for buffers, or it may wait until the first operation.

The absolute file path is resolved. This may include connecting to a remote host and notifying an operator that a removable medium is required. It may include the initialization of a communication device. At this point an error may be returned if the host or medium is not available. The first access to at least the directory within the filesystem is performed. An error will usually be returned if the higher level components of the path (directories) cannot be located or accessed. An error will be returned if the file is expected to exist and it does not or if the file should not already exist and it does.

If the file is expected to exist and it does, the file access, as restricted by permission flags within the file meta data or access control list, is validated against the requested type of operations. This usually requires an additional filesystem access although in some filesystems meta-flags may be part of the directory structure.

If the file is being created, the filesystem may allocate the default initial amount of storage or a specified amount depending on the file system capabilities. If this fails an error will be returned. Updating the directory with the new entry may be performed or it may be delayed until the close is performed.

Various other errors which may occur during the open include directory update failures, un-permitted multiple connections, media failures, communication link failures and device failures.

The return value must always be examined and an error specific action taken.

In many cases programming language-specific run-time library opens may perform additional actions including initializing a run-time library structure related to the file.

As soon as a file is no longer needed, the program should close it. This will cause run-time library and filesystem buffers to be updated to the physical media and permit other processes to access the data if exclusive use had been required. Some run-time libraries may close a file if the program calls the run-time exit. Some filesystems may perform the necessary operations if the program terminates. Neither of these is likely to take place in the event of a kernel or power failure. This can cause damaged filesystem structures requiring the running of privileged and lengthy filesystem utilities during which the entire filesystem may be inaccessible.

== open call arguments ==
1. The pathname to the file,
2. The kind of access requested on the file (read, write, append etc.),
3. The initial file permission is requested using the third argument called mode. This argument is relevant only when a new file is being created.

After using the file, the process should close the file using close call, which takes the file descriptor of the file to be closed. Some filesystems include a disposition to permit releasing the file.

Some computer languages include run-time libraries which include additional functionality for particular filesystems. The open (or some auxiliary routine) may include specifications for key size, record size, connection speed. Some open routines include specification of the program code to be executed in the event of an error.

=== C library POSIX definition ===
The open call is standardized by the POSIX specification for the C language:

int open(const char* path, int oflag, /* mode_t mode */...);
int openat(int fd, const char* path, int oflag, /* mode_t mode */...);
int creat(const char* path, mode_t mode);
FILE* fopen(const char* restrict filename, const char* restrict mode);

The value returned is a file descriptor which is a reference to a process specific structure which contains, among other things, a position pointer that indicates which place in the file will be acted upon by the next operation.

Open may return −1 indicating a failure with errno detailing the error.

The file system also updates a global table of all open files which is used for determining if a file is currently in use by any process.

==== path ====
The name of the file to open. It includes the file path defining where, in which file system, the file is found (or should be created).

openat expects a relative path.

==== oflag ====
This argument formed by OR'ing together optional parameters and (from <fcntl.h>) one of:

O_RDONLY, O_RDWR and O_WRONLY

Option parameters include:

- O_APPEND data written will be appended to the end of the file. The file operations will always adjust the position pointer to the end of the file.
- O_CREAT Create the file if it does not exist; otherwise it has no effect except as noted under O_EXCL below.
- O_EXCL Used with O_CREAT if the file already exists, then fail, setting errno to EEXIST.
- O_TRUNC If the file already exists then discard its previous contents, reducing it to an empty file. Not applicable for a device or named pipe.

Additional flags and errors are defined in open call.

creat() is implemented as:

int creat(const char* path, mode_t mode) {
    return open(path, O_WRONLY | O_CREAT | O_TRUNC, mode);
}

fopen uses string flags such as r, w, a and + and returns a file pointer used with fgets, fputs and fclose.

==== mode ====
Optional and relevant only when creating a new file, defines the file permissions. These include read, write or execute the file by the owner, group or all users. The mode is masked by the calling process's umask: bits set in the umask are cleared in the mode.

== See also ==
- File descriptor – how it works and other functions related to open
