= Paul Davis (programmer) =

British-American software developer

Paul Davis (formerly known as Paul Barton-Davis) is a British-American software developer best known for his work on audio software (JACK) for the Linux operating system, and for his role as one of the first two programmers at Amazon.com.

Davis grew up in the English Midlands and in London. After studying molecular biology and biophysics, he did post-graduate studies in computational biology at the Weizmann Institute of Science in Rehovot and EMBL in Heidelberg.

He immigrated to the U.S. in 1989. He lived in Seattle for seven years, where he worked for the Computer Science and Engineering Department at the University of Washington, and several smaller software companies in Seattle. While in Seattle, he helped to get Amazon.com off the ground during the period 1994–1996, making critical contributions to Amazon's backend systems alongside Shel Kaphan, before subsequently moving to Philadelphia in 1996. In 2019 he moved with his wife to Galisteo, NM

He went on to fund the development of various audio software for Linux, including Ardour and the JACK Audio Connection Kit. He works full-time on free software.

He is also an ultra-marathon runner and touring cyclist.
