= REX2 =

Proprietary audio sample file format

REX2 is a proprietary type of audio sample loop file format developed by Reason Studios, a Swedish music software company.

It is one of the most popular and widely supported loop file formats for sequencer and digital audio workstation software. It is supported by PreSonus Studio One, Reason Studios Reason, Steinberg Cubase, Steinberg Nuendo, Cockos REAPER, Apple Logic, Avid Pro Tools, Ableton Live, Cakewalk Project5, Cakewalk Sonar, Image-Line FL Studio, MOTU Digital Performer, MOTU Mach 5 (software sampler), and Synapse Audio Orion Platinum, among others.

REX files are named after the three-letter filename suffix for "ReCycle EXport", as these are files generated by Reason Studios's ReCycle looping utility. The filename extensions for the file format are .rex and .rx2.

== REX file format and use ==
REX2 loops are created in ReCycle by analyzing audio files to locate zero crossings in the waveform, usually at the start of a beat or other rhythmic point. The file is then divided into "slices" delineated by these markers (a form of metadata). This allows compatible DAW software to adjust the playback start time of each slice, so that the loop can dynamically match the tempo of a song without altering the pitch of the loop, as would normally happen if the audio file was slowed down or sped up. Depending on the host software, individual slices can be triggered via MIDI notes, and individually tuned up and down in pitch if desired.

Royalty-free REX2 Loop and sample collections are now available from many sources.

The original REX format was mono only; REX2 supports mono or stereo files.

The REX2 format uses a proprietary compression algorithm that can reduce the file size by up to 60%.

== See also ==
- ReCycle
- Loopmasters
- Prime Loops
- Beta Monkey Music
- Lucidsamples
