= Lucidsamples =

LucidSamples
- Founded: 2010
- Genre: English Record labels
- Country of origin: United Kingdom
- Location: England
- Official website: lucidsamples.com

LucidSamples is independent English record label based in London, UK. The label has been officially established in 2010 by a group of friends, producers and musicians. LucidSamples releases and publishes DJ sample packs/libraries, construction kits, sound effects, patches and other music production tools. All sample packs provided by LucidSamples are Royalty-Free and downloadable from company website. The company focus is on the development of many popular genres for which they publish sounds collections. Lucidsamples is on the KVR Audio Developers List.

Formats of samples are compatible with major Digital Audio Workstations, created by professional musicians and DJs. LucidSamples website is provided in 4 languages: English, French, German and Polish. The company profiles are available in Social Medias like: Facebook, YouTube, Dailymotion, last.fm, SoundCloud, blend.io.

== Products portfolio and collection ==
The products portfolio and collections include thousands of high quality audio samples of different types, such as: DJ samples, loops samples, drum loops and drum sound, synth loops, sound effects, MIDI samples, multi samples and construction kits, vocals. All the content has been recorded and produced either by Lucidsmples or exclusively for the company.

The sounds, loops and sound effects that can be found on the website have been made using various different methods of postproduction including using equalizer, octaver, shifting the pitch and tempo, playing the sound backwards and with help of other effects and methods.

== Cooperations ==
In 2014 ProducerPack has merged with Lucidsamples. ProducerPack was a sample packs provider with profile similar to Lucidsamples. The company have been also mentioned in some major media and printed magazines as one of significant companies for the DJ music development.

Lucidsamples was the official sponsor for DJ Samples - Deep House Competition featured on house-mixes website and for DJ Competitions during The Rejected Stepchild of the Colder Months...Halloween Competition 2014

Company products are being widely used by beginner as well as professional DJs and musicians across world. In 2017 Lucidsamples has established a cooperation with Point Blank Music School to provide materials for DJ and music production courses.

== Musical genres and styles ==
LucidSamples provides thousands of high quality audio samples different types, music genres and styles such as: chillout, cinematic, classic house, dance, dancehall, deep house, drum and bass, dub, dubstep, EDM, electro, fidget house, funky house, garage, glitch, grime, hands up, hardcore, hardstyle, hip hop, house, industrial, Latin house, minimal, old skool, pop, psy trance, reggae, rock, soca, tech, techno, trance, trap, tribal house, world

== Sound formats and compatibility ==
=== Sample packs ===
Sample Packs are provided and compatible with DAWs standard on PC and MAC platforms like: Ableton Live, Acid Pro, Cakewalk Sonar, Cubase, GarageBand, FL Studio, Logic Pro, Studio One, Pro Tools, Reason, Sony ACID Pro.

=== Available formats ===
WAV Samples (16-Bit or 24-Bit), Apple Loops / AIFF (16-Bit or 24-Bit), Rex2, MIDI, SF2 / Soundfonts, GIGA.

=== Available patches ===
Battery, EXS24, HALion, Kontakt, Maschine, Massive, Reason NN-XT Advanced Sampler, Sylenth
