= Music sequencer =

Device or software that records, edits or plays back musical notes

A music sequencer (or audio sequencer or simply sequencer) is a device or application software that can record, edit, or play back music, by handling note and performance information in several forms, typically CV/Gate, MIDI, or Open Sound Control. Some sequencers can also handle audio and automation data for digital audio workstations (DAWs) and plug-ins.

== Overview ==
=== Modern sequencers ===
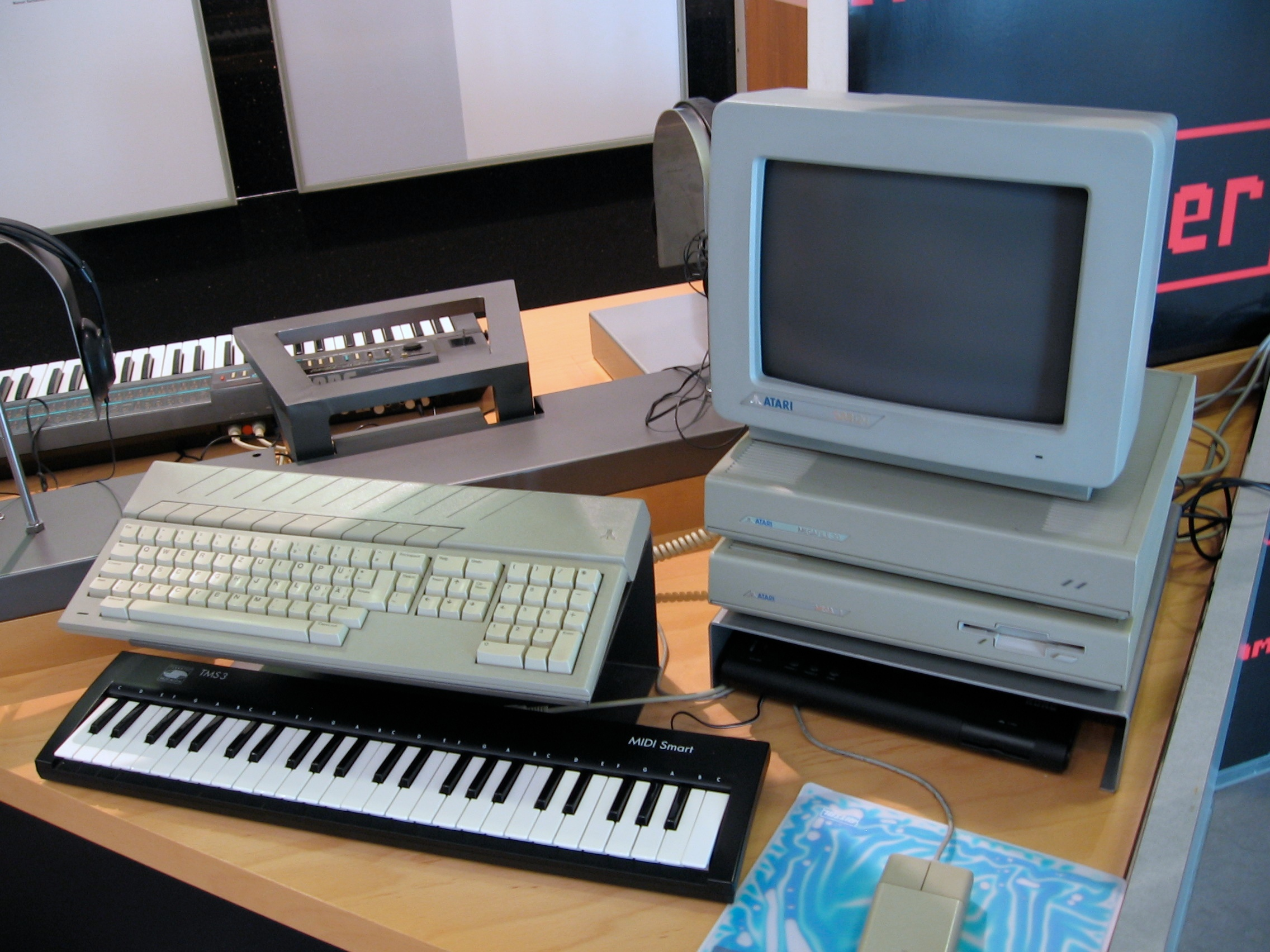
1980s typical software sequencer platform, using Atari Mega ST computer

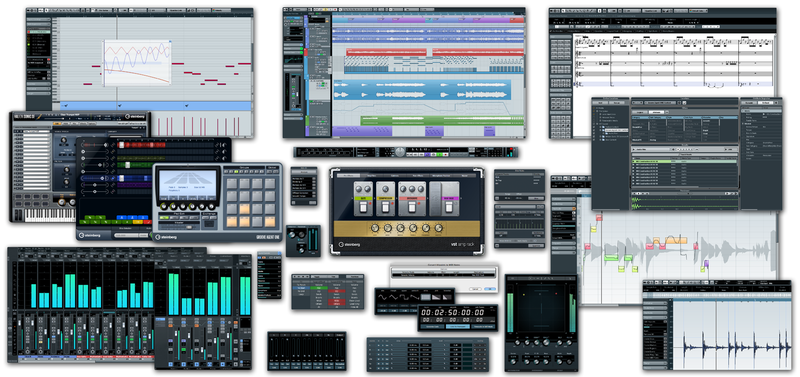
Today's typical software sequencer, supporting multitrack audio and plug-ins (Steinberg Cubase 6)

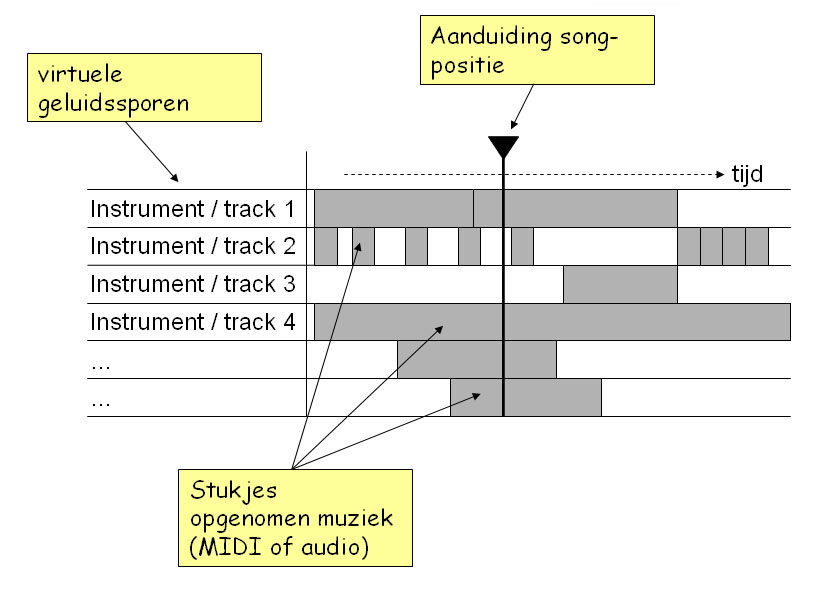
User interface on Steinberg Cubase 6, a digital audio workstation with an integrated software sequencer

The advent of Musical Instrument Digital Interface (MIDI) in the 1980s gave programmers the opportunity to design software that could more easily record and play back sequences of notes played or programmed by a musician. As the technology matured, sequencers gained more features, such as the ability to record multitrack audio. Sequencers used for audio recording are called digital audio workstations (DAWs).

Many modern sequencers can be used to control virtual instruments implemented as software plug-ins. This allows musicians to replace expensive and cumbersome standalone synthesizers with their software equivalents.

Today the term sequencer is often used to describe software. However, hardware sequencers still exist. Workstation keyboards have their own proprietary built-in MIDI sequencers. Drum machines and some older synthesizers have their own step sequencer built in. The market demand for standalone hardware MIDI sequencers has diminished greatly due to the greater feature set of their software counterparts.

== Types of music sequencer ==
Music sequencers can be categorized by handling data types, such as:

- MIDI data for MIDI sequencers
- CV/Gate data for analog sequencers (Note: For a sequencer using a light source, see Circle Machine on #Analog sequencers and Raymond Scott#Electronics and research. and possibly others (via CV/Gate interfaces))
- Automation data for mixing-automation in DAWs, (Note: Automation parameters in DAWs are often interoperable with MIDI messages, i.e. Control Changes (CC) or System Exclusive (SysEx); in that case, it can be controlled in real-time via pre-assigned MIDI messages generated by MIDI controllers or MIDI sequencers, etc. And even more so, in several DAWs, automation parameters are explicitly recorded as MIDI messages on their embedded MIDI sequencers.) and software effect or instrument plug-ins for DAWs with sequencing features
- Audio data in audio sequencers including DAWs, loop-based music software, etc.; or phrase samplers including grooveboxes, etc.

Also, a music sequencer can be categorized by its construction and supported modes.

=== Analog sequencer ===
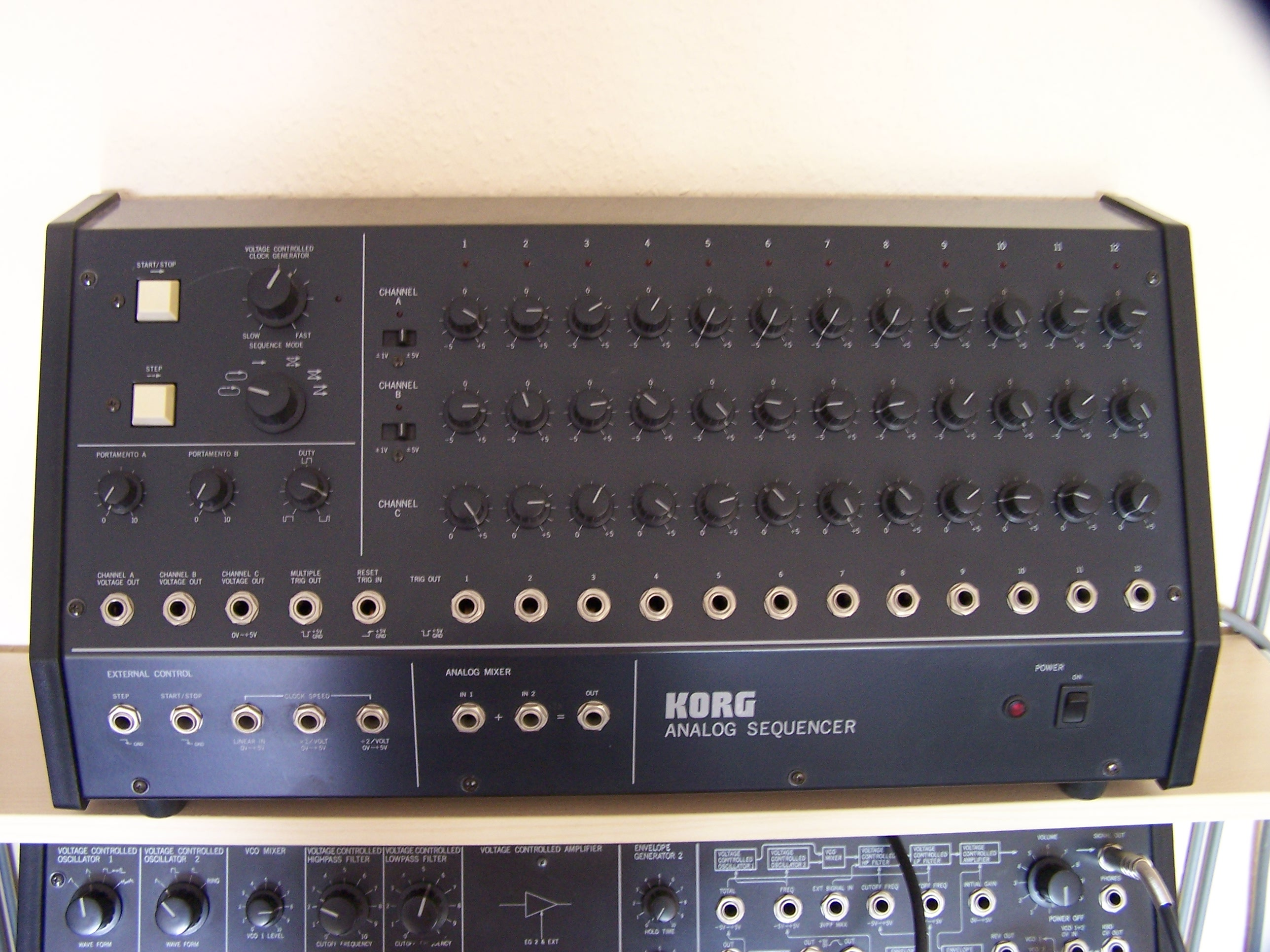
An analog sequencer

Analog sequencers are typically implemented with analog electronics, and play the musical notes designated by a series of knobs or sliders for adjusting the note corresponding to each step in the sequence. It is designed for both composition and live performance; users can change the musical notes at any time without regard to recording mode. The time interval between each musical note (length of each step) may be independently adjustable. Typically, analog sequencers are used to generate repeated minimalistic phrases which may be reminiscent of Tangerine Dream, Giorgio Moroder or trance music.

=== Step sequencer (step recording mode) ===
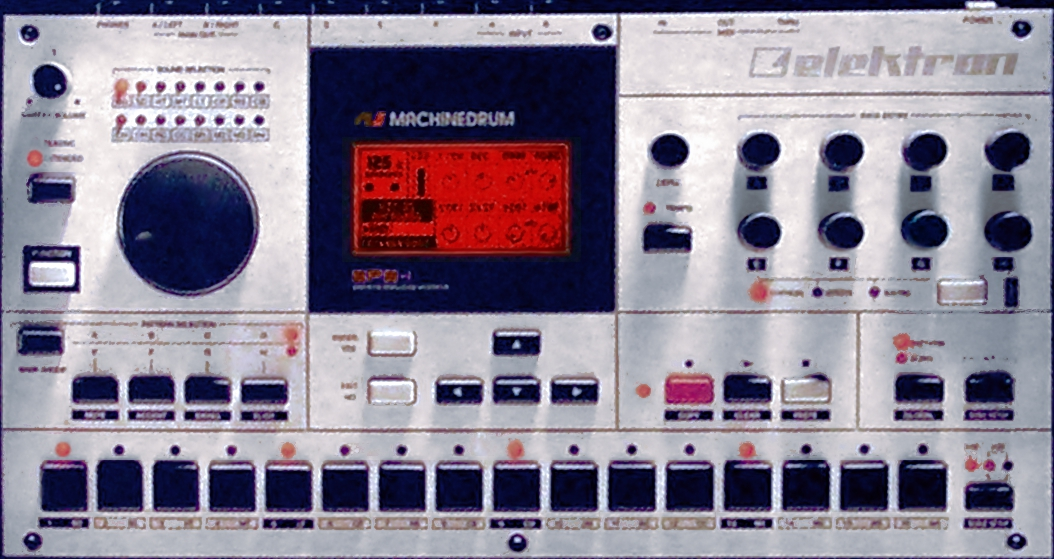
A step rhythm sequencer on the drum machine

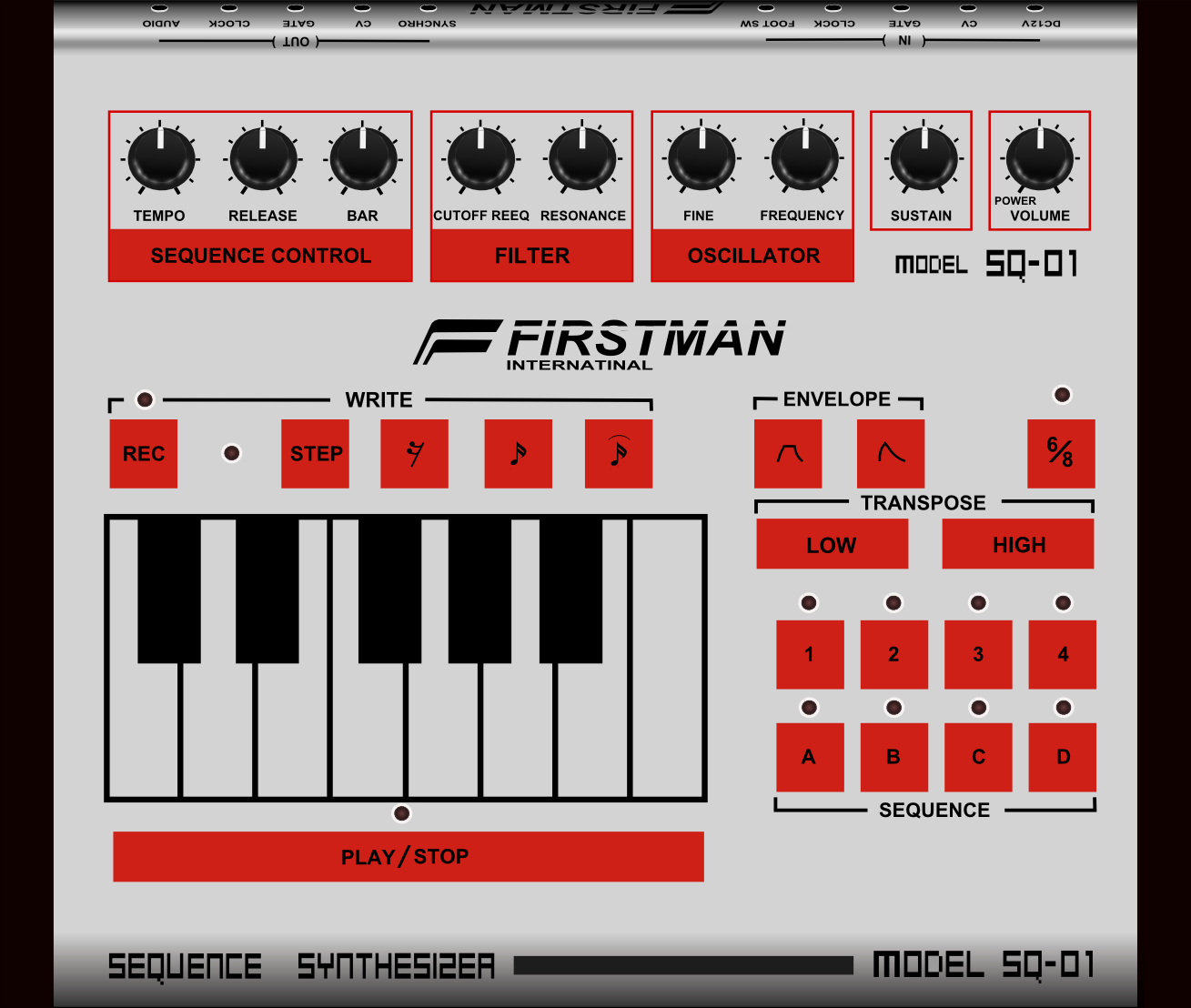
A step note sequencer on the bass machine

On step sequencers, musical notes are rounded into steps of equal time intervals, and users can enter each musical note without exact timing; Instead, the timing and duration of each step can be designated in several different ways:

- On drum machines: select a trigger timing from a row of step-buttons.
- On bass machines: select a step note (or rest) from a chromatic keypad, then select a step duration (or tie) from a group of length-buttons, sequentially.
- On several home keyboards: in addition to the real-time sequencer, a pair of step trigger buttons is provided; using it, notes on the pre-recorded sequence can be triggered in arbitrary timings for the timing dedicated recordings or performances.

In general, step mode, along with roughly quantized semi-realtime mode, is often supported on the drum machines, bass machines and several groove machines.

=== Realtime sequencer (realtime recording mode) ===
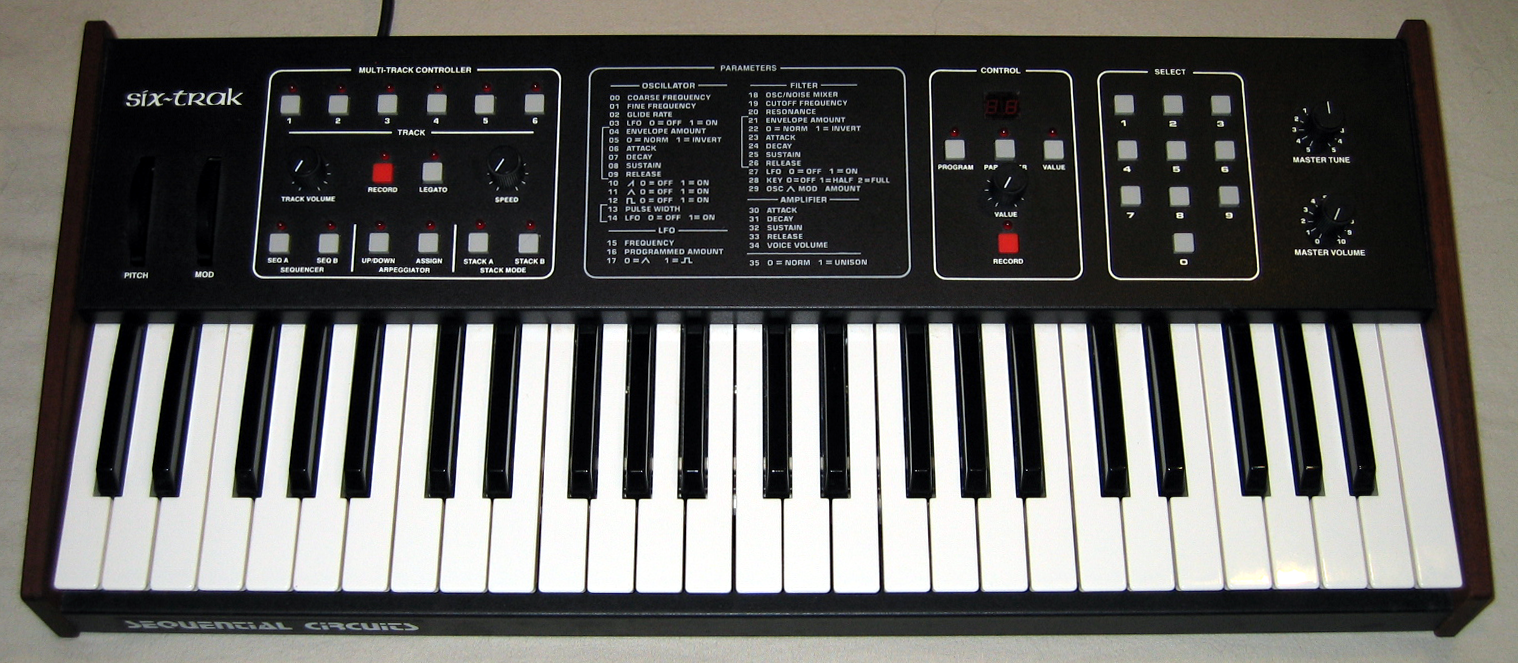
A realtime sequencer on the synthesizer

Realtime sequencers record the musical notes in real-time as on audio recorders, and play back musical notes with designated tempo, quantizations, and pitch. For editing, often punch in/out features originating in tape recording workflows are provided. This mode is widely supported on software sequencers, DAWs, and built-in hardware sequencers.

=== Software sequencer ===
A software sequencer is application software providing the functionality of a music sequencer, and often provided as one feature of the DAW or the integrated music authoring environments. The user may control the software sequencer either by using the graphical user interfaces or a specialized input devices, such as a MIDI controller.

Typical features on software sequencers
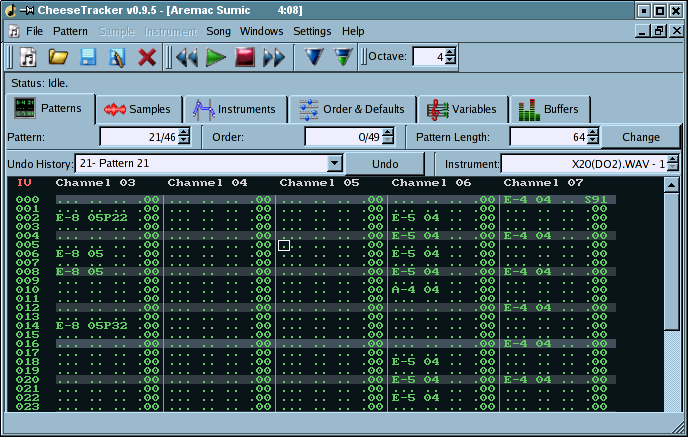
Numerical editor on music tracker
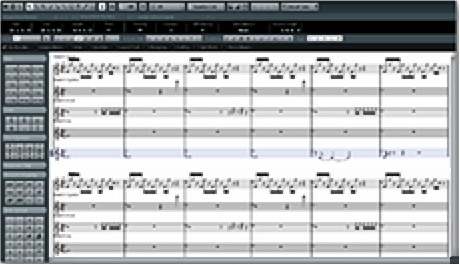
Scorewriter
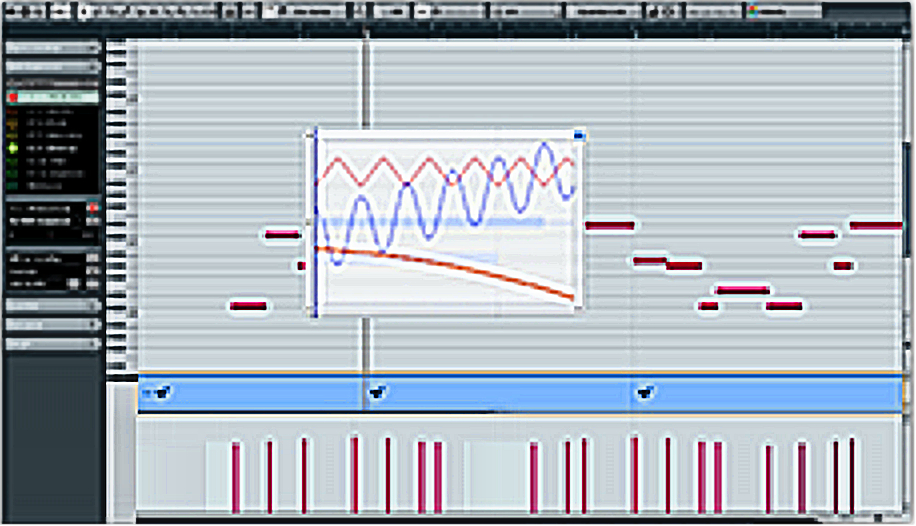
Piano roll editor with strip chart
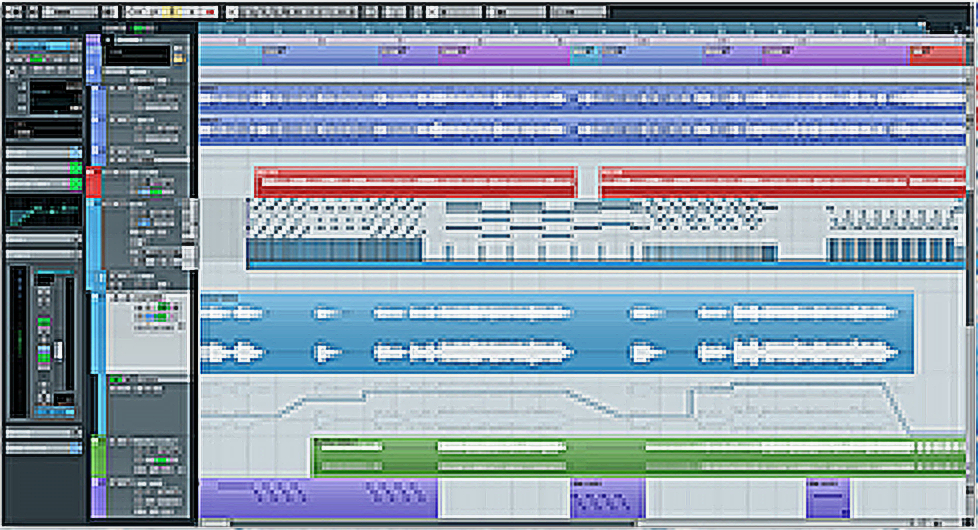
Audio and MIDI tracks on DAW
Automated, software studio environment including instruments and effect processors
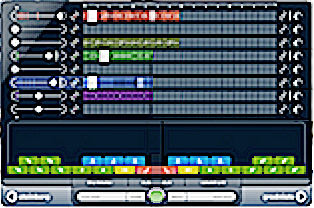
Loop sequencer
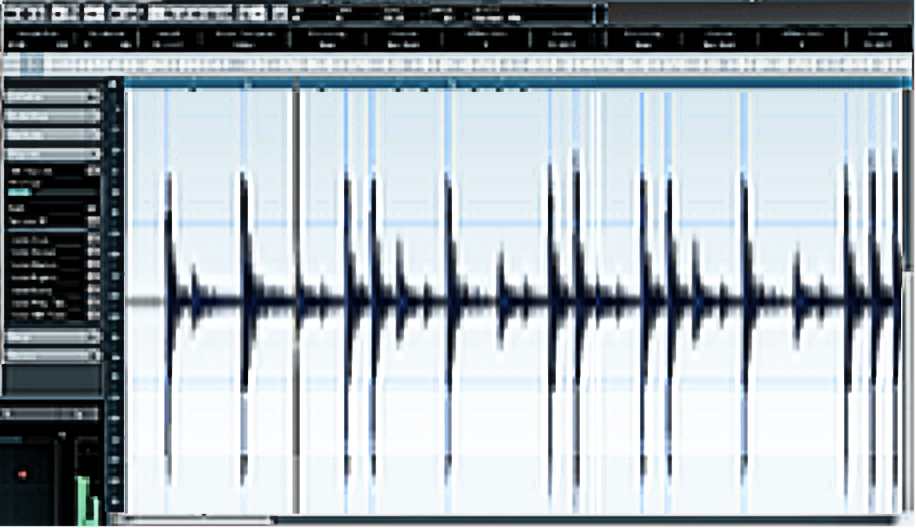
Sample editor with beat slicer
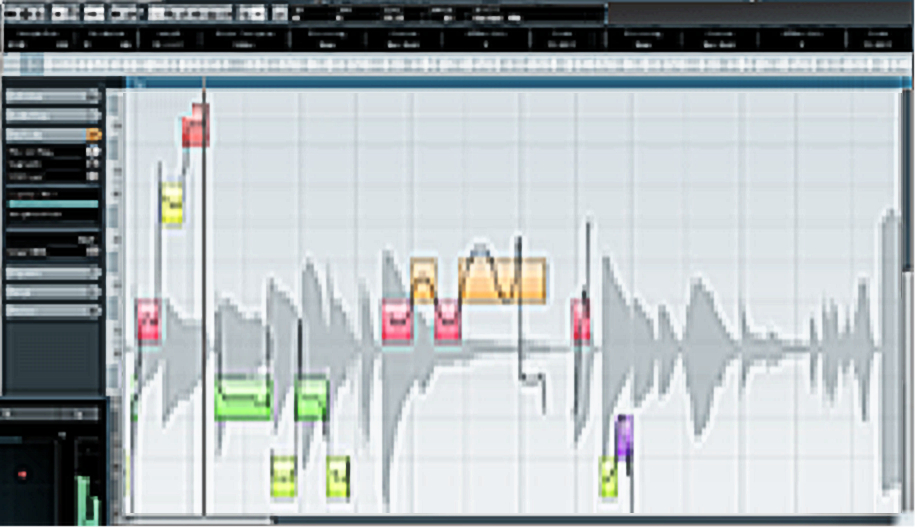
Vocal editor for pitch and timing
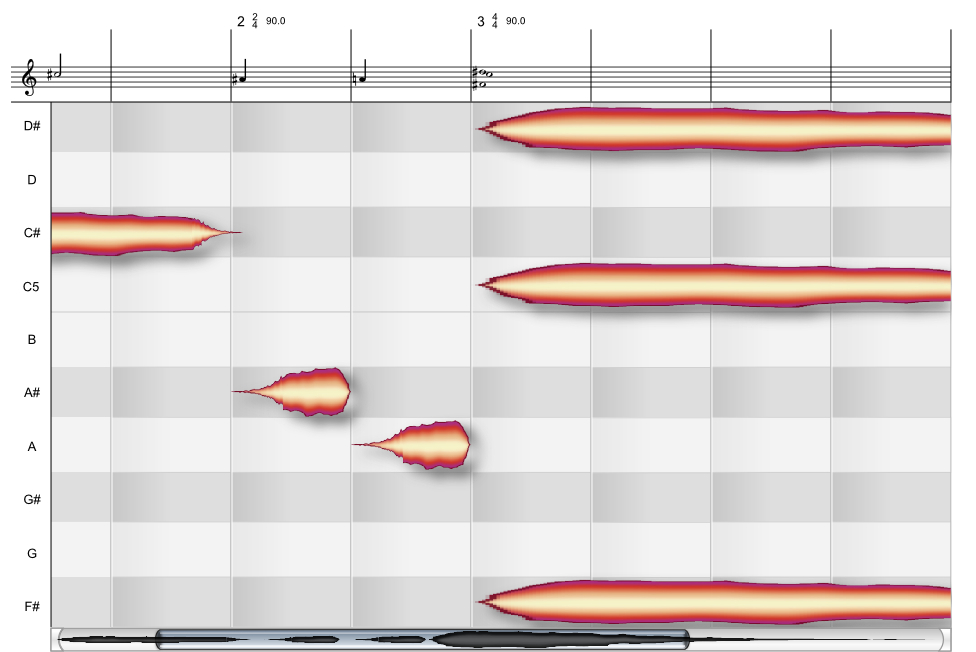

Note manipulation on audio tracks

=== Audio sequencer ===
Alternative subsets of audio sequencers include:

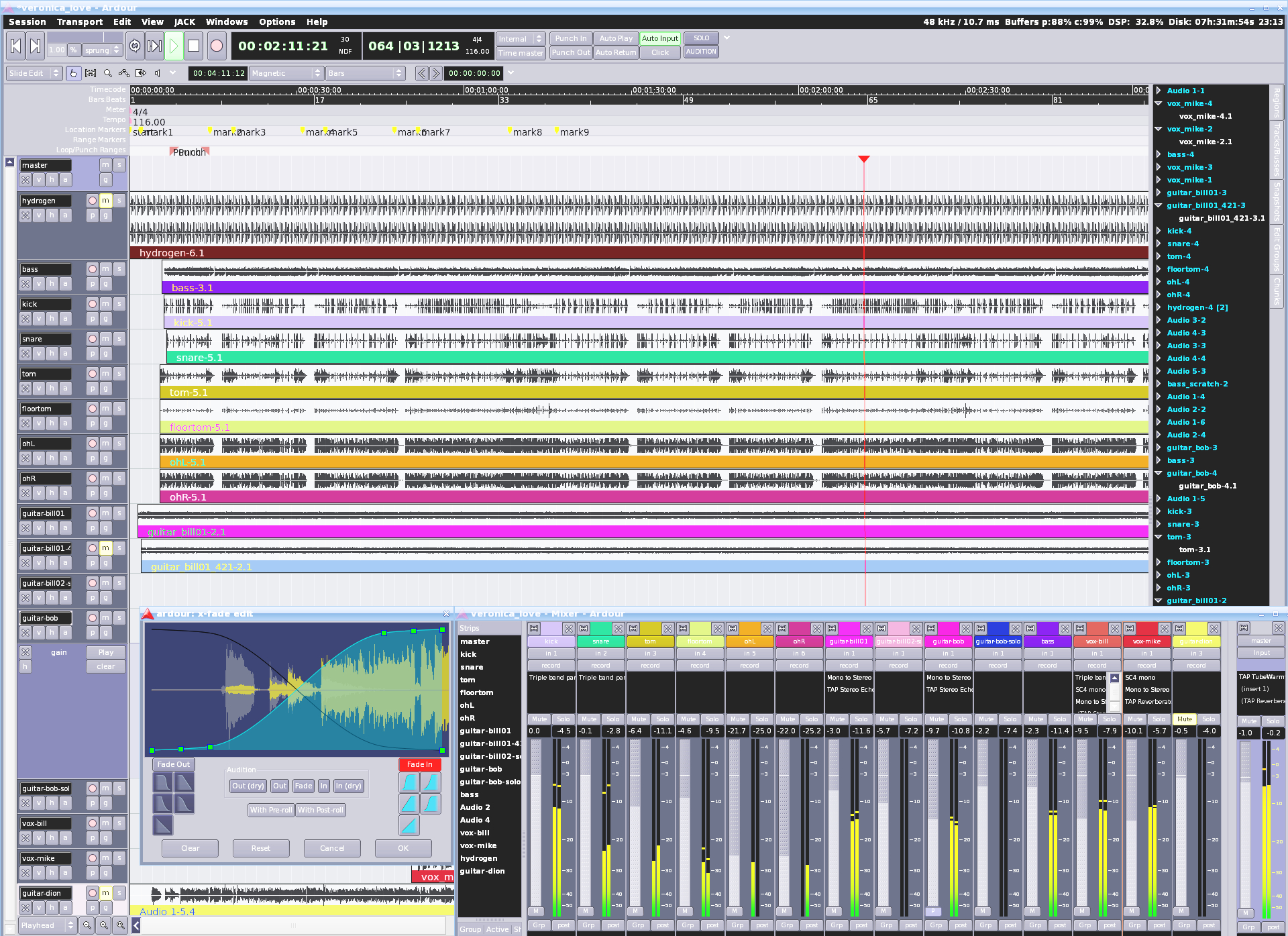
A typica DAW (Ardour)

Digital audio workstation (DAW), hard disk recorder — a class of audio software or dedicated system primarily designed to record, edit, and play back digital audio, first appeared in the late 1970s and emerging since the 1990s. After the 1990s–2000s, several DAWs for music production were integrated with a music sequencer. DAW integrated with MIDI sequencer is often simply abbreviated as DAW, or sometimes referred to as Audio and MIDI sequencer, etc.

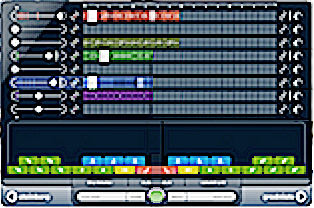
A typical loop-based music software (Cubase 6 LoopMash 2)

Loop-based music software — a class of music software for loop-based music compositions and remix, available since the late 1990s. Typical software included ACID Pro (1998), Ableton Live (2001) and GarageBand (2004). Some of these platforms are now considered DAWs due to expansions of feature sets or integrations.
Looping's core feature, audio time stretching and pitch scaling allows users to control audio samples via MIDI in several aspects; user can designate pitches and durations independently on short music samples, as on MIDI notes.

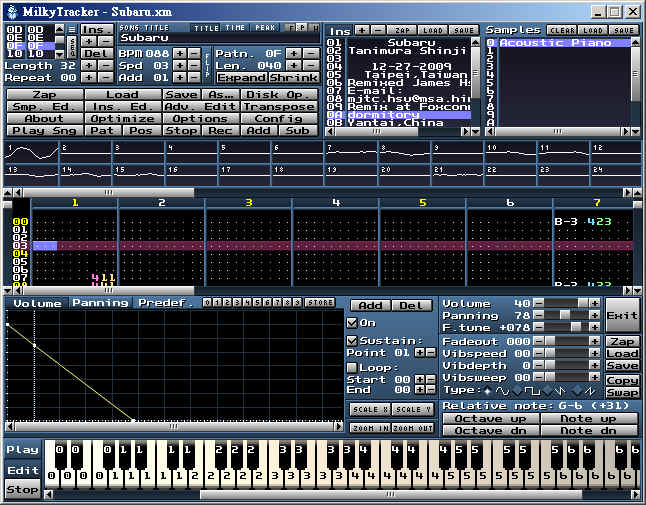
A typical Tracker software (MilkyTracker)

Tracker (music software) — a class of software music sequencer with embedded sample players, developed in the 1980s. Although it provides early ability to sequence sampled sounds similar to grooveboxes and later loop-based music software, its design is dated.

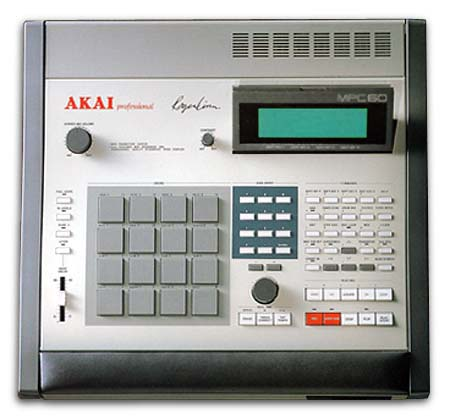
A typical groovebox (Akai MPC60) providing sampler and sequencer

Phrase sampler — similar to above, musicians or remixers sometimes remixed or composed songs by sampling relatively long phrases or parts of songs, and then rearranging these on grooveboxes or a combination of sampler (musical instrument) and sequencer.

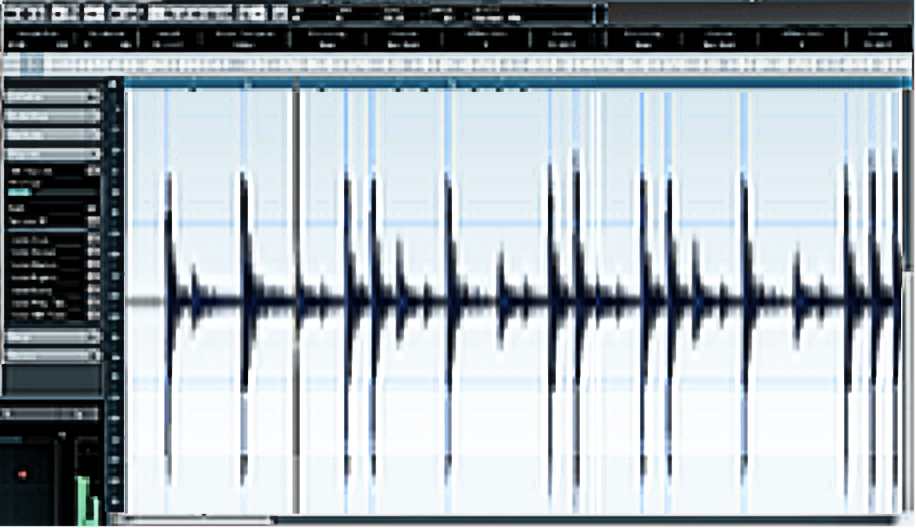
A typical beat slicer (Cubase 6.0 Sample Editor)

Beat slicing — before the DAW became popular, musicians sometimes derived various beats from limited drum sample loops by slicing beats and rearranging them on samplers. This technique, called beat slicing, was popularized with the introduction of beat slicer tool, especially the ReCycle released in 1992.

== History ==
=== Early sequencers ===
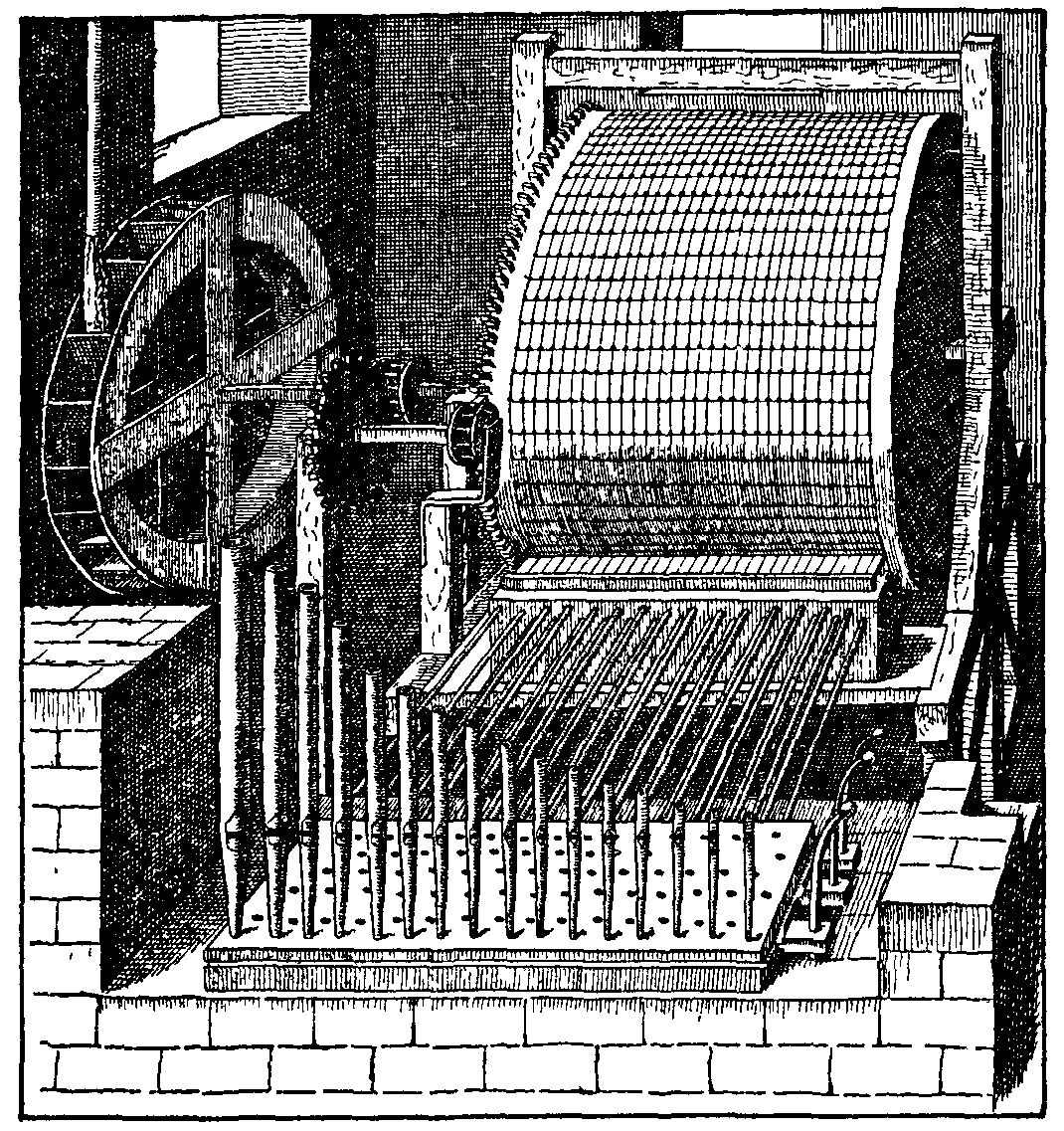
Barrel with pins on a large stationary barrel organ

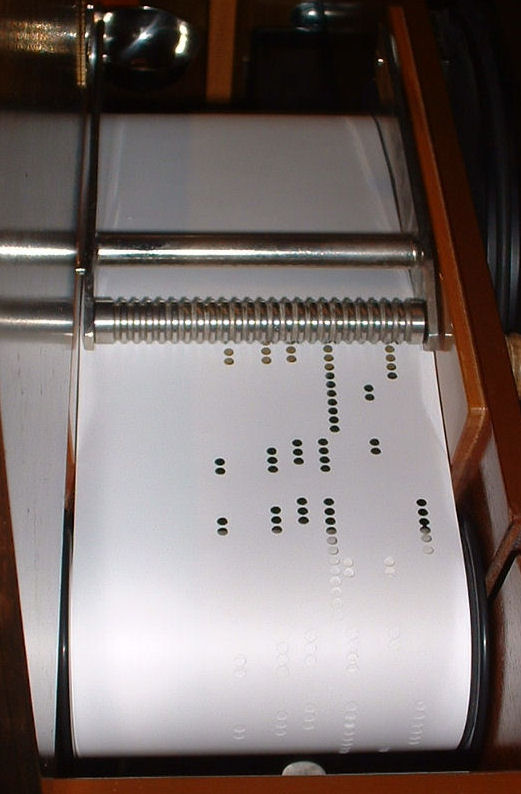
Music roll on a barrel organ

The early music sequencers were sound-producing devices such as music boxes, mechanical organs, player pianos, and Orchestrions. Player pianos, for example, had much in common with contemporary sequencers. Composers or arrangers transmitted music to piano rolls which were subsequently edited by technicians who prepared the rolls for mass duplication. Eventually consumers were able to purchase these rolls and play them back on their own player pianos.

As early as the 9th century, the Persian (Iranian) Banū Mūsā brothers invented a hydropowered organ using exchangeable cylinders with pins, and also an automatic flute-playing machine using steam power, as described in their Book of Ingenious Devices. The Banu Musa brothers' automatic flute player was the first programmable music sequencer device, and the first example of repetitive music technology, powered by hydraulics.

In 1206, Al-Jazari, an Arab engineer, invented programmable musical automata, a "robot band" which performed "more than fifty facial and body actions during each musical selection." It was notably the first programmable drum machine as, among the four automated musicians, were two drummers. The drum machine used pegs on cams to bump into levers that operated the percussion. The drummers could be made to play different rhythms and different drum patterns if the pegs were moved around.

In the 14th century, rotating cylinders with pins were used to play a carillon (steam organ) in Flanders, and at least in the 15th century, barrel organs were seen in the Netherlands.

Player piano (1920) controlled by piano roll

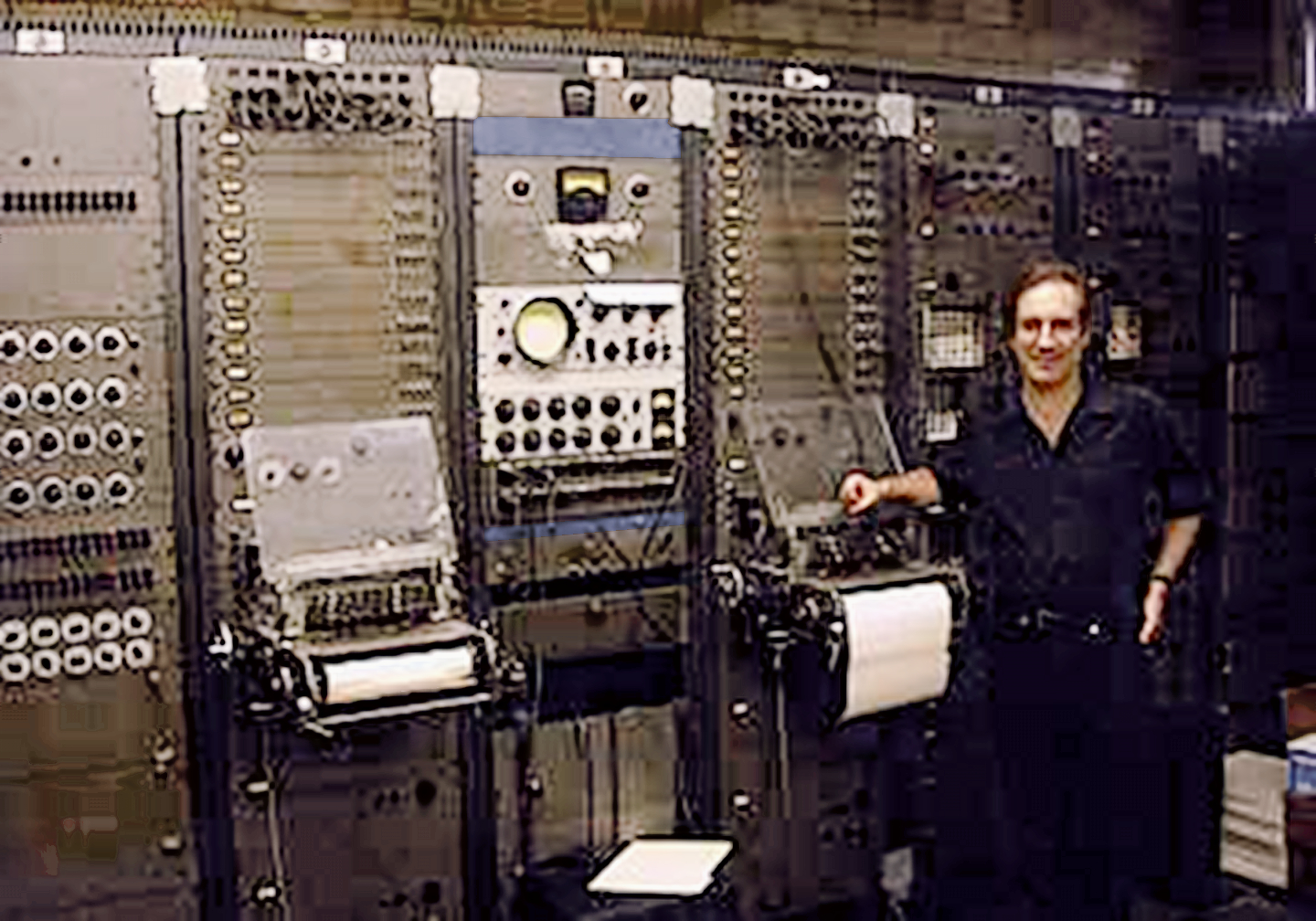
RCA Mark II (1957), controlled via wide punched-paper roll

In the late-18th or early-19th century, with technological advances of the Industrial Revolution, various automatic musical instruments were invented. Some examples: music boxes, barrel organs and barrel pianos consisting of a barrel or cylinder with pins or a flat metal disc with punched holes; or mechanical organs, player pianos and orchestrions using book music or music rolls (piano rolls) with punched holes, etc. These instruments were disseminated widely as popular entertainment devices prior to the inventions of phonographs, radios, and sound films which eventually eclipsed all such home music production devices. Of them all, punched-paper-tape media had been used until the mid-20th century. The earliest programmable music synthesizers, including the RCA Mark II Sound Synthesizer in 1957, and the Siemens Synthesizer in 1959, were also controlled via punch tapes similar to piano rolls.

Additional inventions grew out of sound film audio technology. The drawn sound technique, which appeared in the late 1920s, is notable as a precursor of today's intuitive graphical user interfaces. In this technique, notes and various sound parameters are triggered by hand-drawn black ink waveforms directly upon the film substrate; hence they resemble piano rolls (or the strip charts of modern sequencers and DAWs). Drawn soundtracks were often used in early experimental electronic music, including the Variophone developed by Yevgeny Sholpo in 1930, and the Oramics designed by Daphne Oram in 1957.

=== Analog sequencers ===
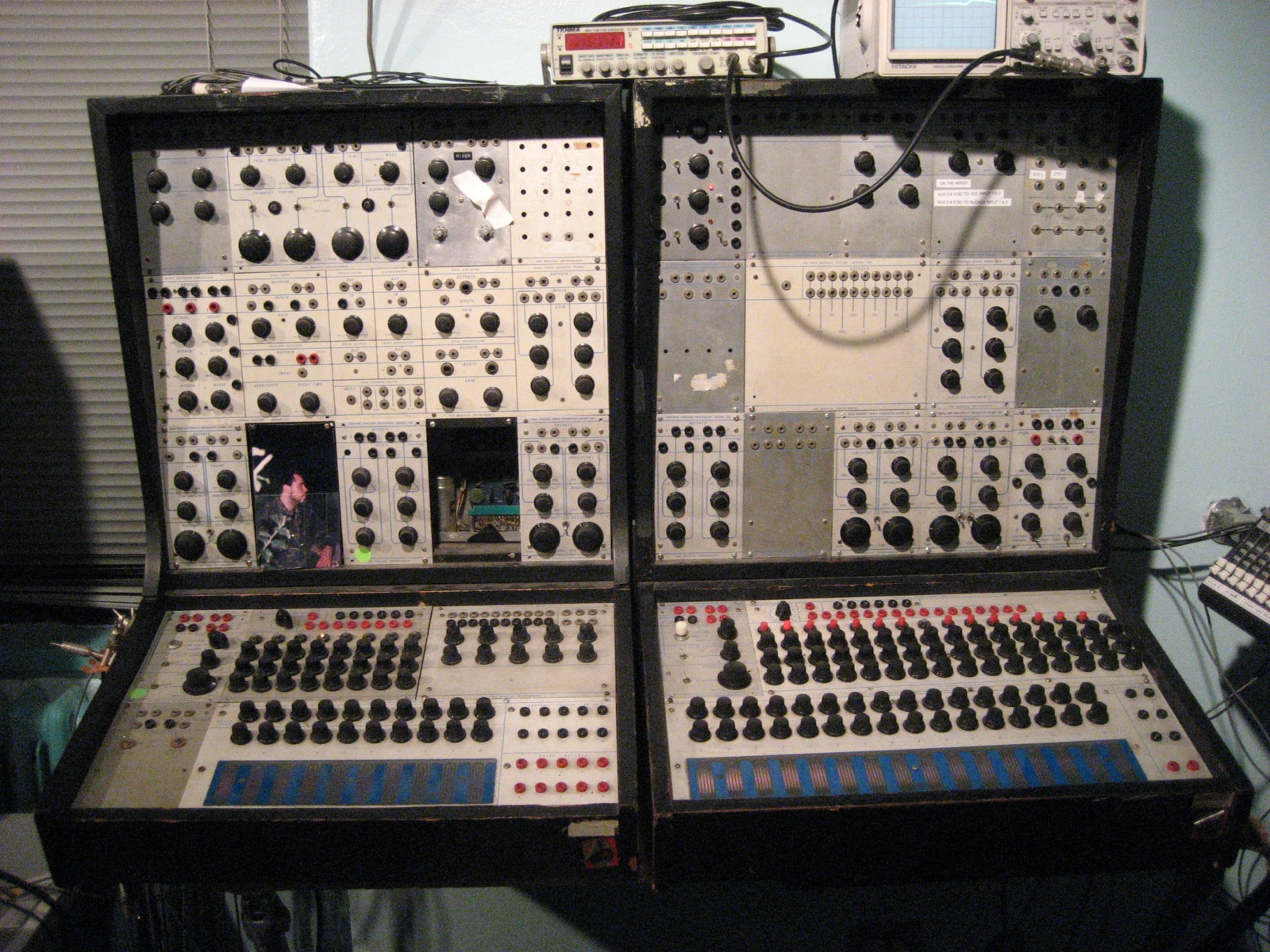
Early commercially available analog sequencers (bottom) on Buchla 100 (1964/1966)

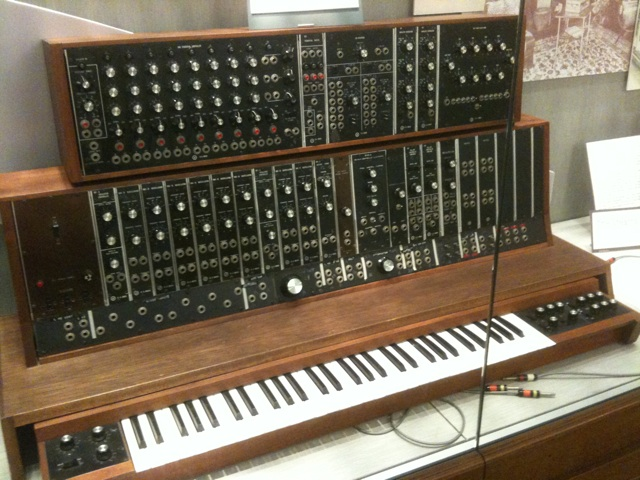
Moog sequencer module (top left, probably added after 1968) on Moog Modular (1964)

During the 1940s–1960s, Raymond Scott, an American composer of electronic music, invented various kind of music sequencers for his electric compositions. The "Wall of Sound", once covered on the wall of his studio in New York during the 1940s–1950s, was an electro-mechanical sequencer to produce rhythmic patterns, consisting of stepping relays (used on dial pulse telephone exchange), solenoids, control switches, and tone circuits with 16 individual oscillators. Later, Robert Moog would explain it in such terms as "the whole room would go 'clack – clack – clack', and the sounds would come out all over the place". The Circle Machine, developed in 1959, had incandescent bulbs each with its own rheostat, arranged in a ring, and a rotating arm with photocell scanning over the ring, to generate an arbitrary waveform. Also, the rotating speed of the arm was controlled via the brightness of lights, and as a result, arbitrary rhythms were generated. The first electronic sequencer was invented by Raymond Scott, using thyratrons and relays.

Clavivox, developed since 1952, was a kind of keyboard synthesizer with sequencer. On its prototype, a theremin manufactured by young Robert Moog was utilized to enable portamento over 3-octave range, and on later version, it was replaced by a pair of photographic film and photocell for controlling the pitch by voltage.

In 1968, Ralph Lundsten and Leo Nilsson had a polyphonic synthesizer with sequencer called Andromatic built for them by Erkki Kurenniemi.

=== Step sequencers ===
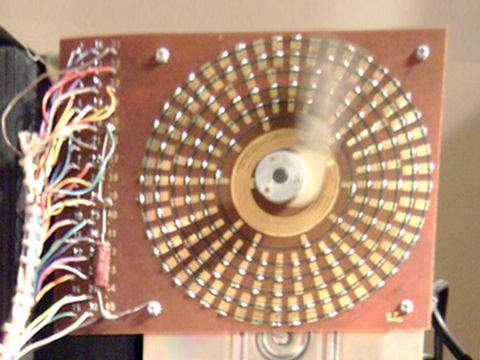
Electro-mechanical disc sequencer on early drum machine (1959)

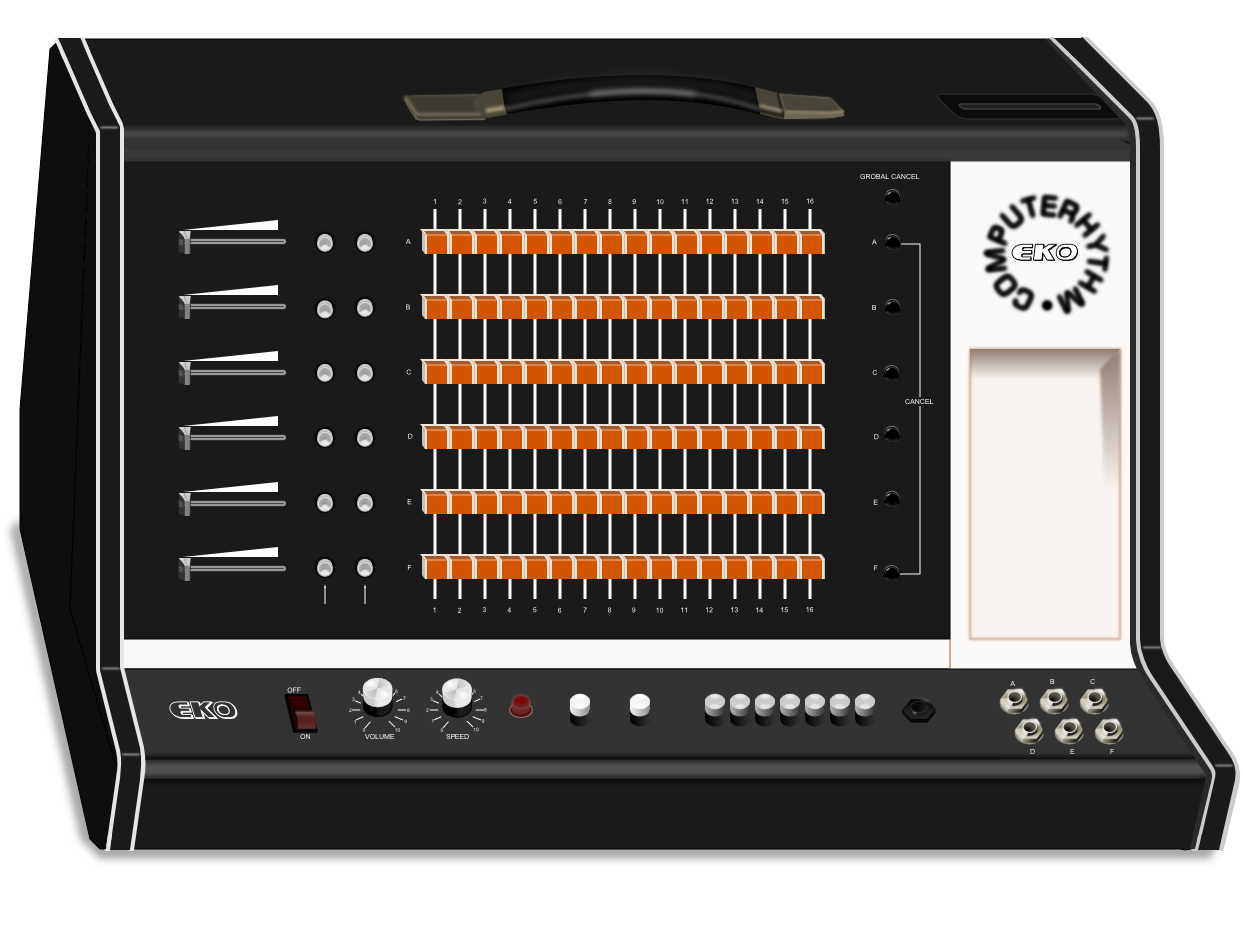
Eko ComputeRhythm (1972), one of the earliest programmable drum machines

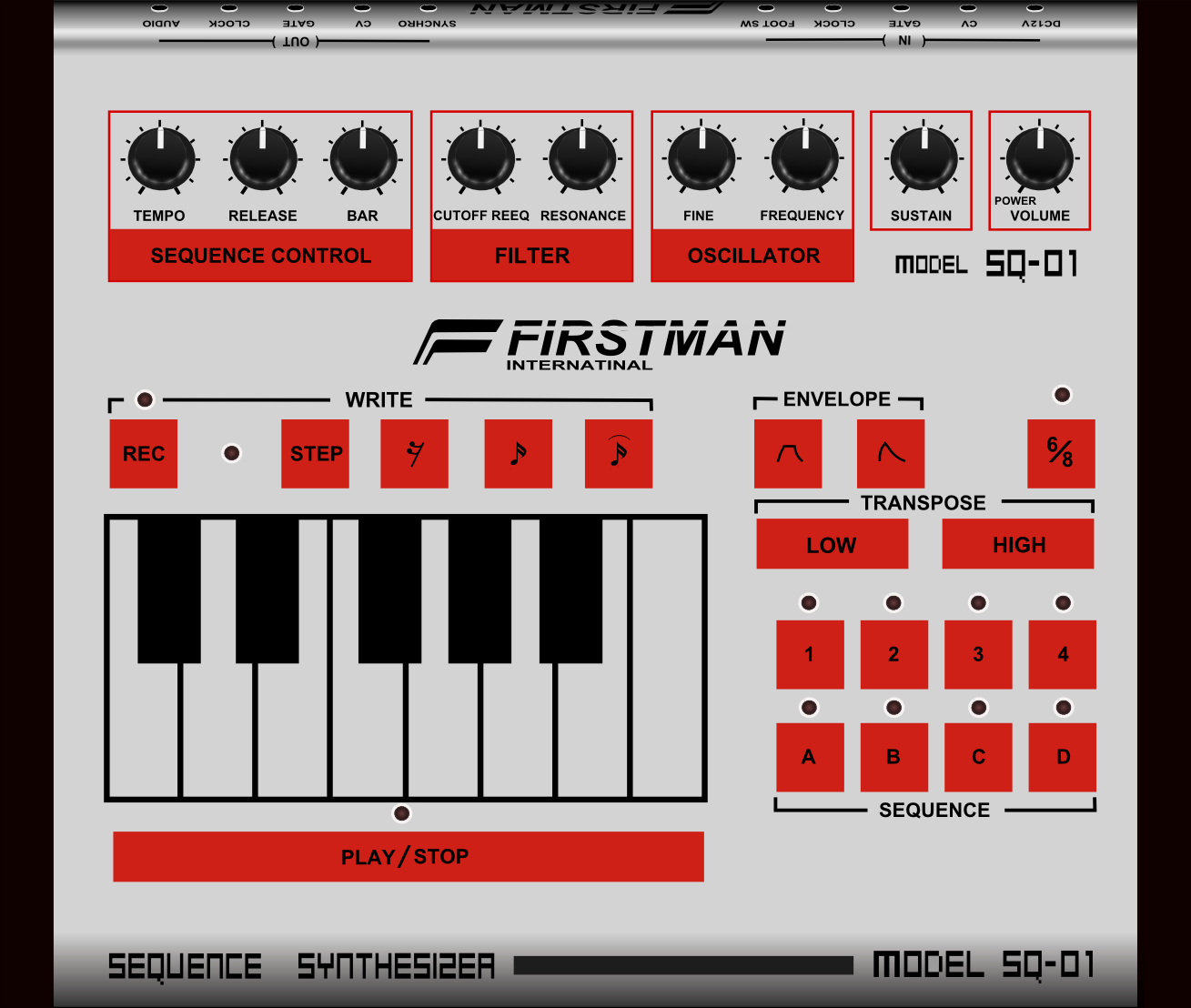
Firstman SQ-01 (1980), one of the earliest step bass machines

The step sequencers played rigid patterns of notes using a grid of (usually) 16 buttons, or steps, each step being 1/16 of a measure. These patterns of notes were then chained together to form longer compositions. Sequencers of this kind are still in use, mostly built into drum machines and grooveboxes. They are monophonic by nature, although some are multi-timbral, meaning that they can control several different sounds but only play one note on each of those sounds.

=== Early computers ===
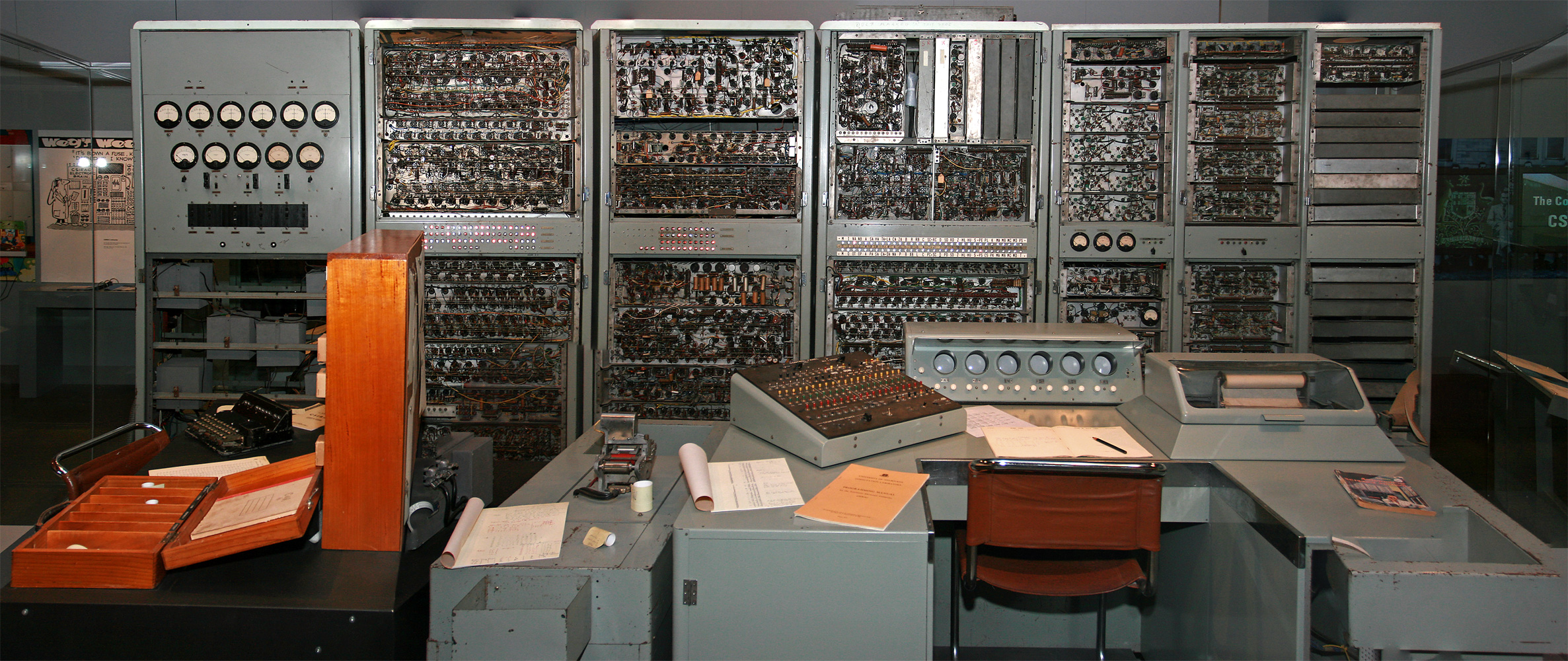
CSIRAC played the earliest computer music in 1951.

On the other hand, software sequencers were continuously utilized since the 1950s in the context of computer music, including computer-played music (software sequencer), computer-composed music (music synthesis), and computer sound generation (sound synthesis). In June 1951, the first computer music Colonel Bogey was played on CSIRAC, Australia's first digital computer. In 1956, Lejaren Hiller at the University of Illinois at Urbana–Champaign wrote one of the earliest programs for computer music composition on ILLIAC, and collaborated on the first piece, Illiac Suite for String Quartet, with Leonard Issaction. In 1957 Max Mathews at Bell Labs wrote MUSIC, the first widely used program for sound generation, and a 17-second composition was performed by the IBM 704 computer. Subsequently, computer music was mainly researched on the expensive mainframe computers in computer centers, until the 1970s when minicomputers and then microcomputers became available in this field.

==== In Japan ====
In Japan, experiments in computer music date back to 1962, when Keio University professor Sekine and Toshiba engineer Hayashi experimented with the TOSBAC computer. This resulted in a piece entitled TOSBAC Suite.

=== Early computer music hardware ===
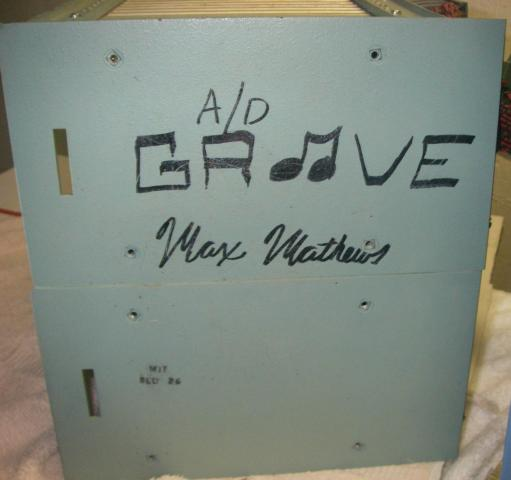
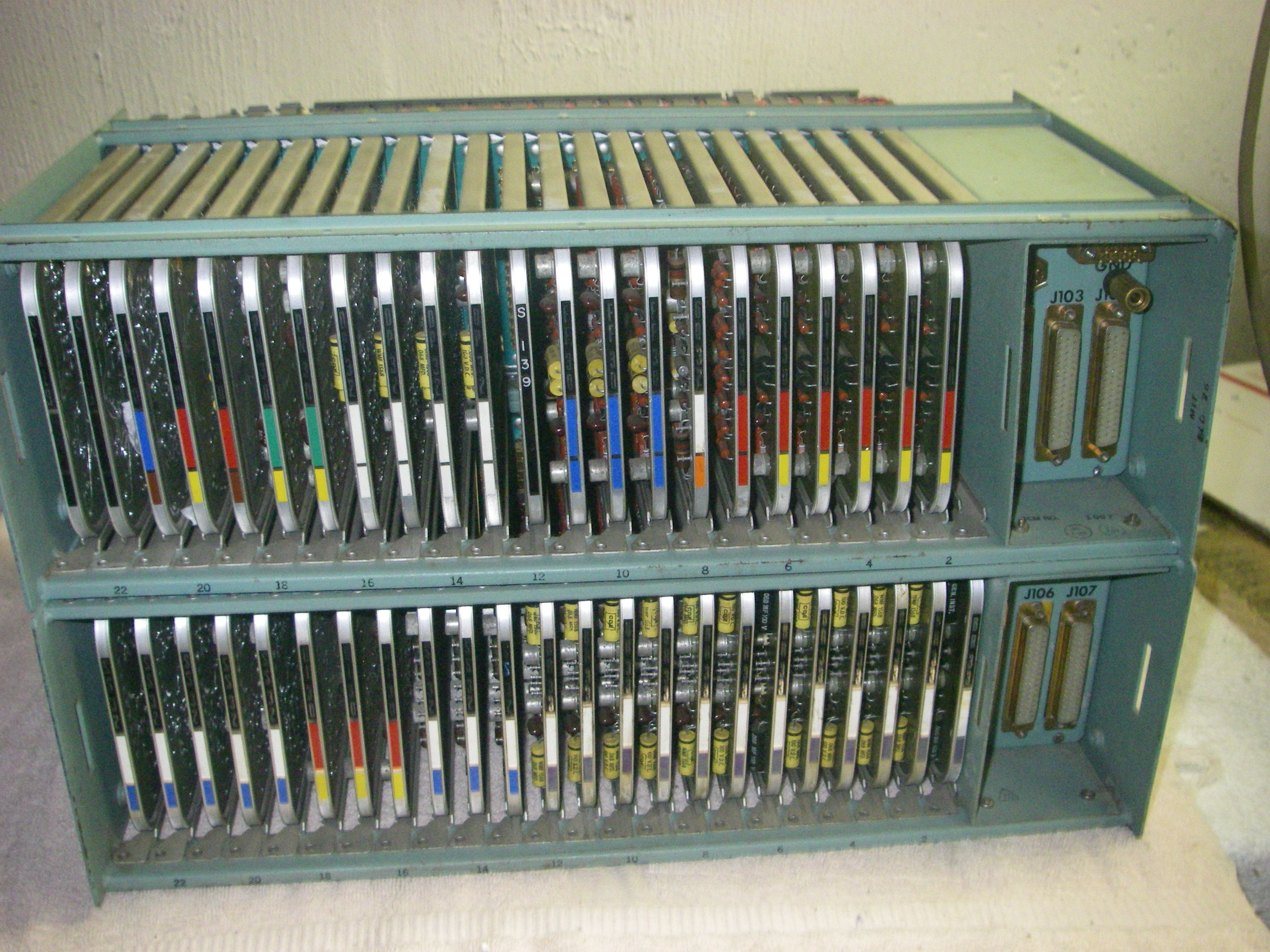
DDP-24 S Block (expansion card rack unit) that is assumed the A/D converters used for GROOVE (1970) by Max Mathews

In 1965, Max Mathews and L. Rosler developed Graphic 1, an interactive graphical sound system (that implies sequencer) on which one could draw figures using a light-pen that would be converted into sound, simplifying the process of composing computer-generated music. It used PDP-5 minicomputer for data input, and IBM 7094 mainframe computer for rendering sound.

Also in 1970, Mathews and F. R. Moore developed the GROOVE (Generated Real-time Output Operations on Voltage-controlled Equipment) system, a first fully developed music synthesis system for interactive composition (that implies sequencer) and realtime performance, using 3C/Honeywell DDP-24 (or DDP-224) minicomputers. It used a CRT display to simplify the management of music synthesis in realtime, 12-bit D/A converter for realtime sound playback, an interface for CV/gate analog devices, and even several controllers including a musical keyboard, knobs, and rotating joysticks to capture realtime performance.

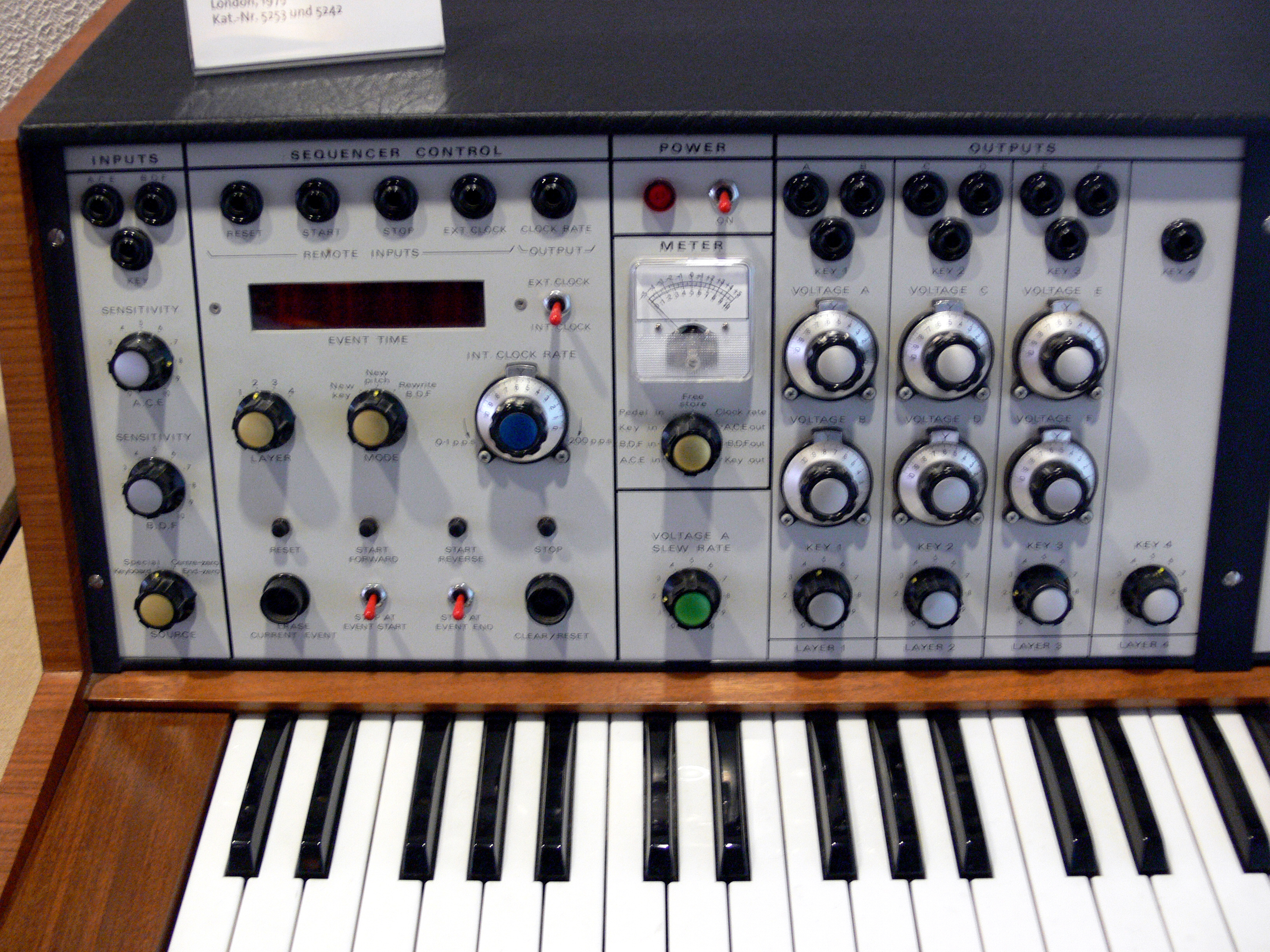
EMS Sequencer 256 (1971), branched from Synthi 100

=== Digital sequencers ===
In 1971, Electronic Music Studios (EMS) released one of the first digital sequencer products as a module of Synthi 100, and its derivation, Synthi Sequencer series. After then, Oberheim released the DS-2 Digital Sequencer in 1974, and Sequential Circuits released Model 800 in 1977

==== In Japan ====
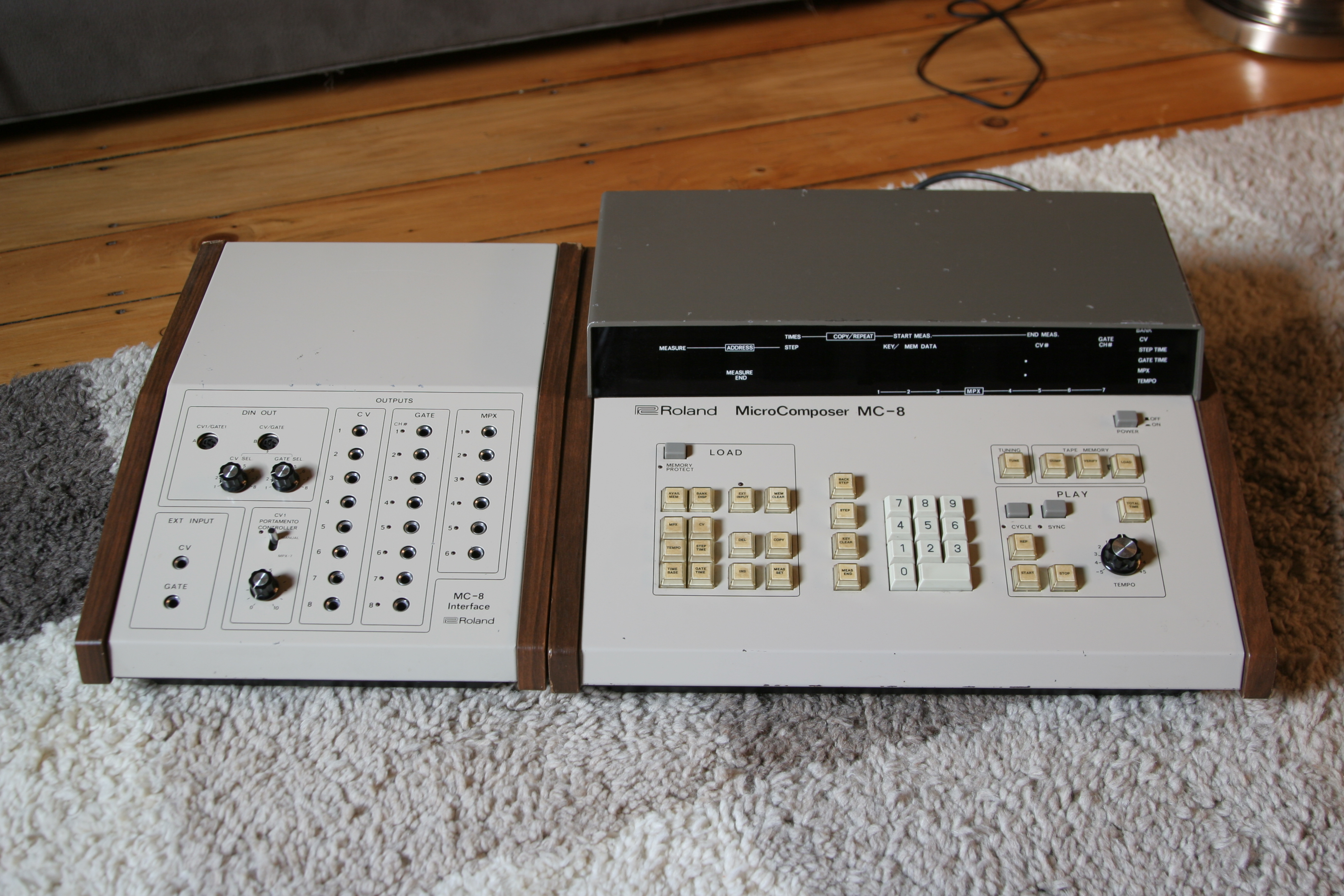
Roland MC-8 MicroComposer (1977)

In 1977, Roland Corporation released the MC-8 MicroComposer, also called computer music composer by Roland. It was an early stand-alone, microprocessor-based, digital CV/gate sequencer, and an early polyphonic sequencer. It equipped a keypad to enter notes as numeric codes, 16 KB of RAM for a maximum of 5200 notes (large for the time), and a polyphony function which allocated multiple pitch CVs to a single Gate. It was capable of eight-channel polyphony, allowing the creation of polyrhythmic sequences. The MC-8 had a significant impact on popular electronic music, with the MC-8 and its descendants (such as the Roland MC-4 Microcomposer) impacting popular electronic music production in the 1970s and 1980s more than any other family of sequencers. The MC-8's earliest known users were Yellow Magic Orchestra in 1978.

=== Music workstations ===
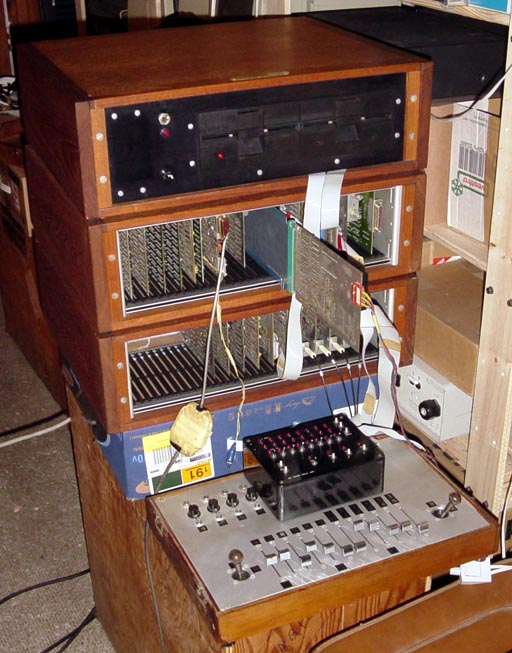
Synclavier I (1977)

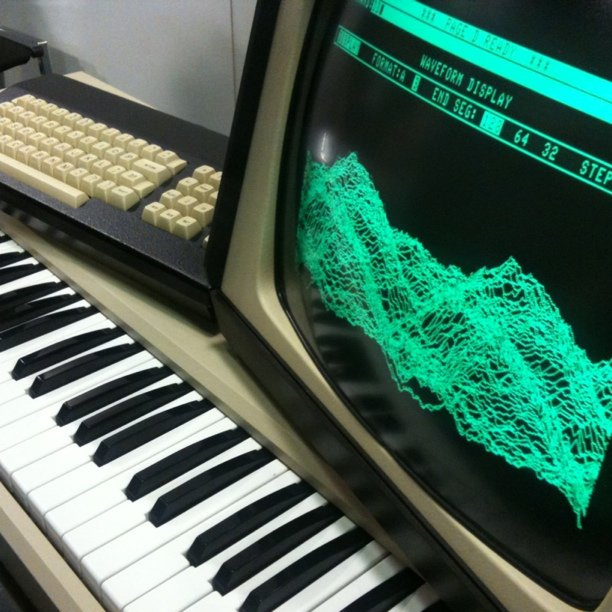
Fairlight CMI (1979) supporting MCL (sequencer)

In 1975, New England Digital (NED) released ABLE computer (microcomputer) as a dedicated data processing unit for Dartmouth Digital Synthesizer (1973), and based on it, later Synclavier series were developed.

The Synclavier I, released in September 1977, was one of the earliest digital music workstation product with multitrack sequencer. Synclavier series evolved throughout the late-1970s to the mid-1980s, and they also established integration of digital-audio and music-sequencer, on their Direct-to-Disk option in 1984, and later Tapeless Studio system.

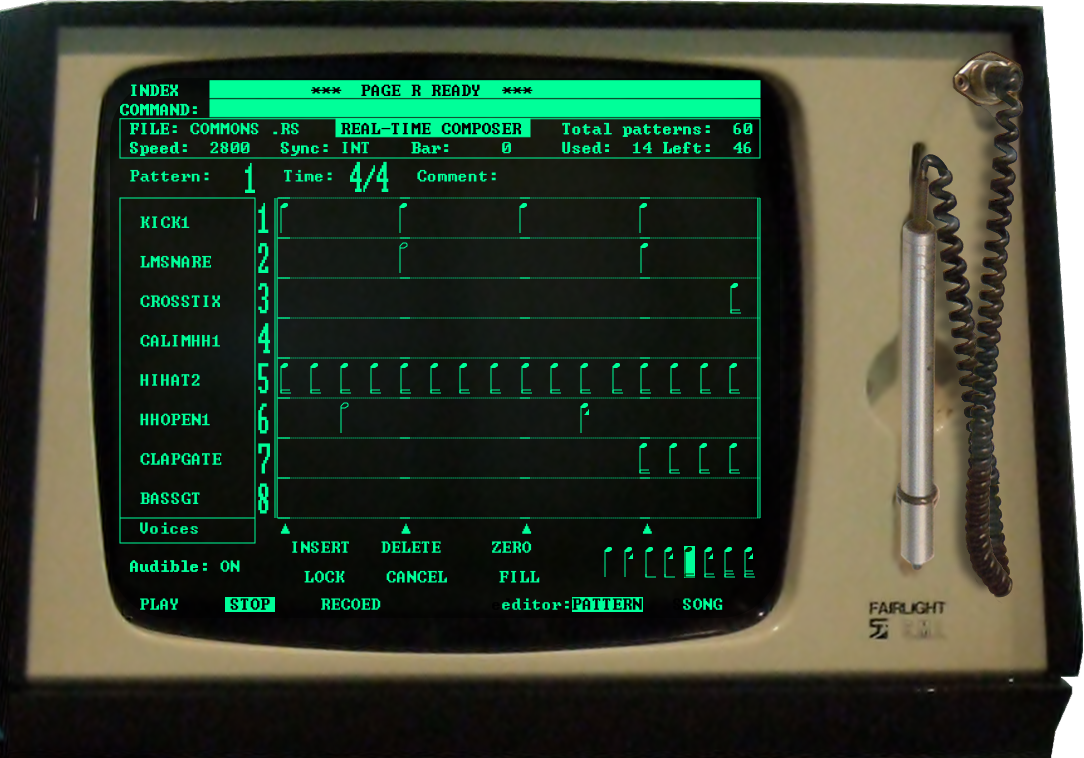
Page R on Fairlight

In 1982, renewed the Fairlight CMI Series II and added new sequencer software Page R, which combined step sequencing with sample playback.

While there were earlier microprocessor-based sequencers for digital polyphonic synthesizers, (Note: In 1974–1975, Australian computer music engineer Tony Furse developed the MC6800-based Qasar M8 with a software sequencer MUSEQ 8, with a minimum price of $8,000. In 1976, it was licensed to Fairlight Instruments Pty Ltd., and eventually Fairlight CMI was released in 1979 (for details, see Fairlight CMI). Also in 1975, New England Digital released original microprocessor-based ABLE computer (utilizing mini-computer architecture) as a future migration target of Dartmouth Digital Synthesizer. Their commercial version of digital synthesizer, Synclavier I was first shipped in 1977 (for details, see Synclavier).) their early products tended to prefer the newer internal digital buses than the old-style analogue CV/gate interface once used on their prototype system. Then in the early-1980s, they also re-recognized the needs of CV/gate interface, and supported it along with MIDI as options.

==== In Japan ====
Yamaha's GS-1, their first FM digital synthesizer, was released in 1980.

=== MIDI sequencers ===
In June 1981, Roland Corporation founder Ikutaro Kakehashi proposed the concept of standardization between different manufacturers' instruments as well as computers, to Oberheim Electronics founder Tom Oberheim and Sequential Circuits president Dave Smith. In October 1981, Kakehashi, Oberheim and Smith discussed the concept with representatives from Yamaha, Korg and Kawai. In 1983, the MIDI standard was unveiled by Kakehashi and Smith. The first MIDI sequencer was the Roland MSQ-700, released in 1983.

It was not until the advent of MIDI that general-purpose computers started to play a role as sequencers. Following the widespread adoption of MIDI, computer-based MIDI sequencers were developed. MIDI-to-CV/gate converters were then used to enable analogue synthesizers to be controlled by a MIDI sequencer. Since its introduction, MIDI has remained the musical instrument industry standard interface through to the present day.

=== Personal computers ===
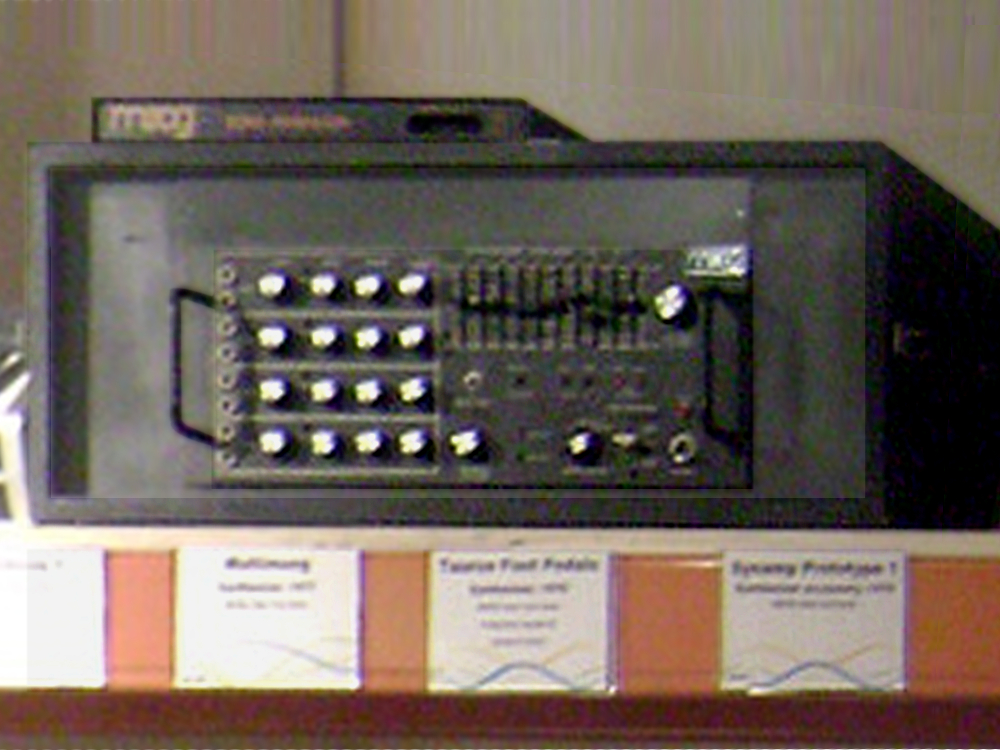
Moog Song Producer (1983) MIDI & CV/Gate interface on SynAmp

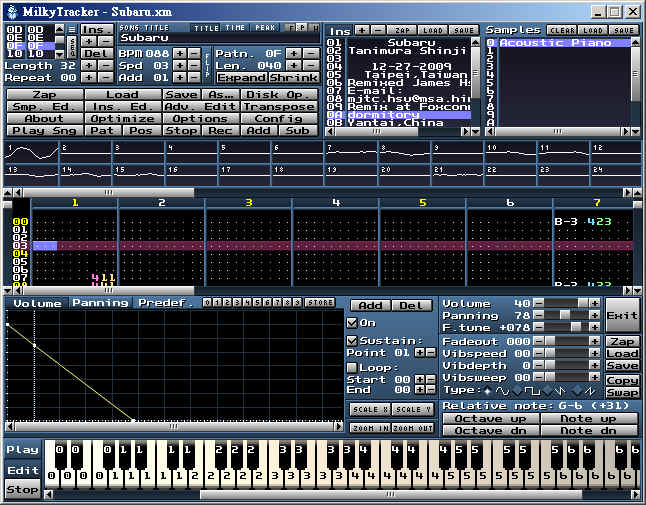
Tracker software (developed since 1987)

In 1987, software sequencers called trackers were developed to realize the low-cost integration of sampling sound and interactive digital sequencer as seen on Fairlight CMI II Page R. They became popular in the 1980s and 1990s as simple sequencers for creating computer game music, and remain popular in the demoscene and chiptune music.

Modern computer digital audio software after the 2000s, such as Ableton Live, incorporates aspects of sequencers among many other features.

==== In Japan ====
In 1978, Japanese personal computers such as the Hitachi Basic Master equipped the low-bit D/A converter to generate sound which can be sequenced using Music Macro Language (MML). This was used to produce chiptune video game music.

It was not until the advent of MIDI, introduced to the public in 1983, that general-purpose computers really started to play a role as software sequencers. NEC's personal computers, the PC-88 and PC-98, added support for MIDI sequencing with MML programming in 1982. In 1983, Yamaha modules for the MSX featured music production capabilities, real-time FM synthesis with sequencing, MIDI sequencing, and a graphical user interface for the software sequencer. Also in 1983, Roland Corporation's CMU-800 sound module introduced music synthesis and sequencing to the PC, Apple II, and Commodore 64.

The spread of MIDI on personal computers was facilitated by Roland's MPU-401, released in 1984. It was the first MIDI-equipped PC sound card, capable of MIDI sound processing and sequencing. After Roland sold MPU sound chips to other sound card manufacturers, it established a universal standard MIDI-to-PC interface. Following the widespread adoption of MIDI, computer-based MIDI software sequencers were developed.

=== Visual timeline of rhythm sequencers ===
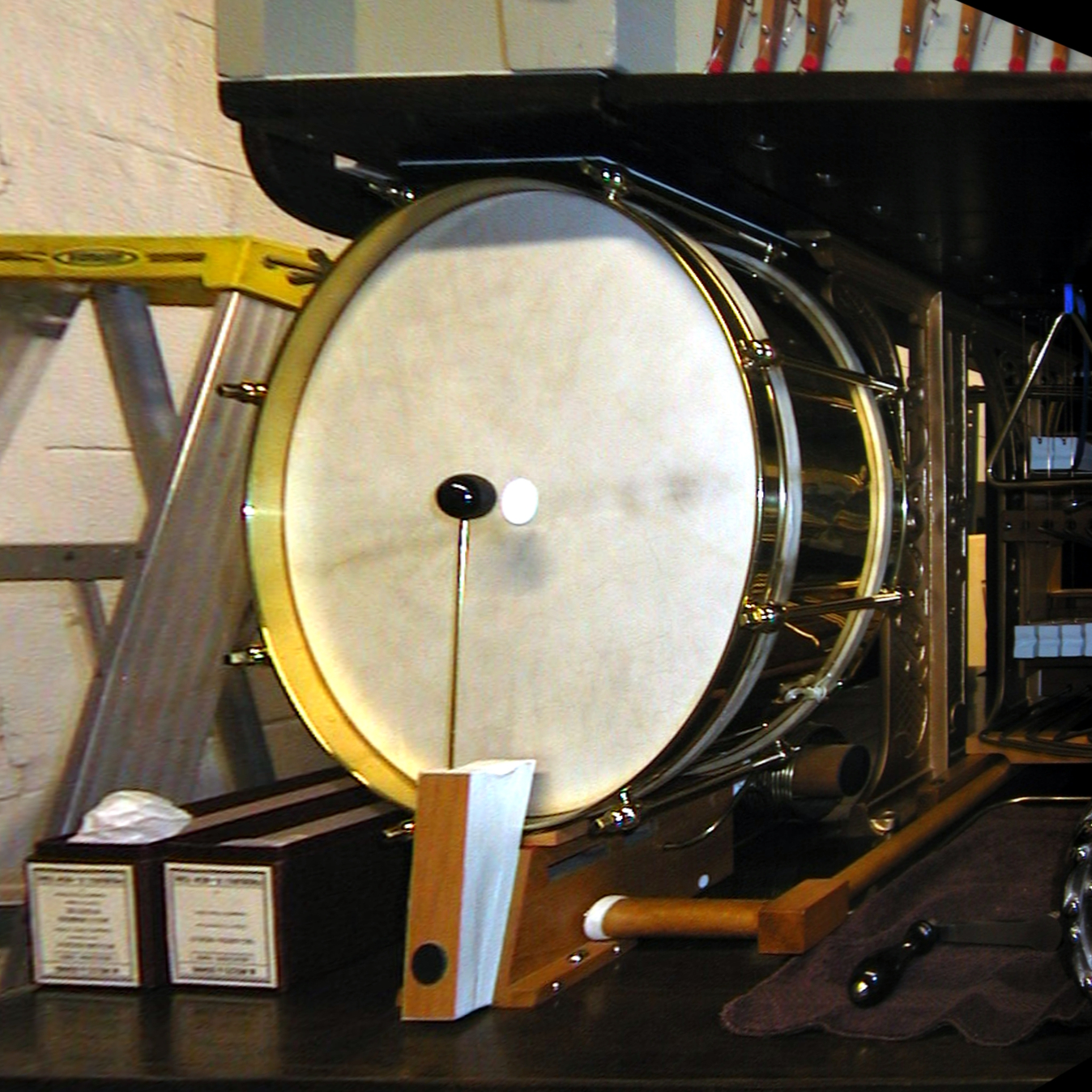

Mechanical (pre-20th century)

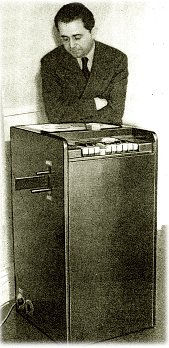

Rhythmicon (1930)

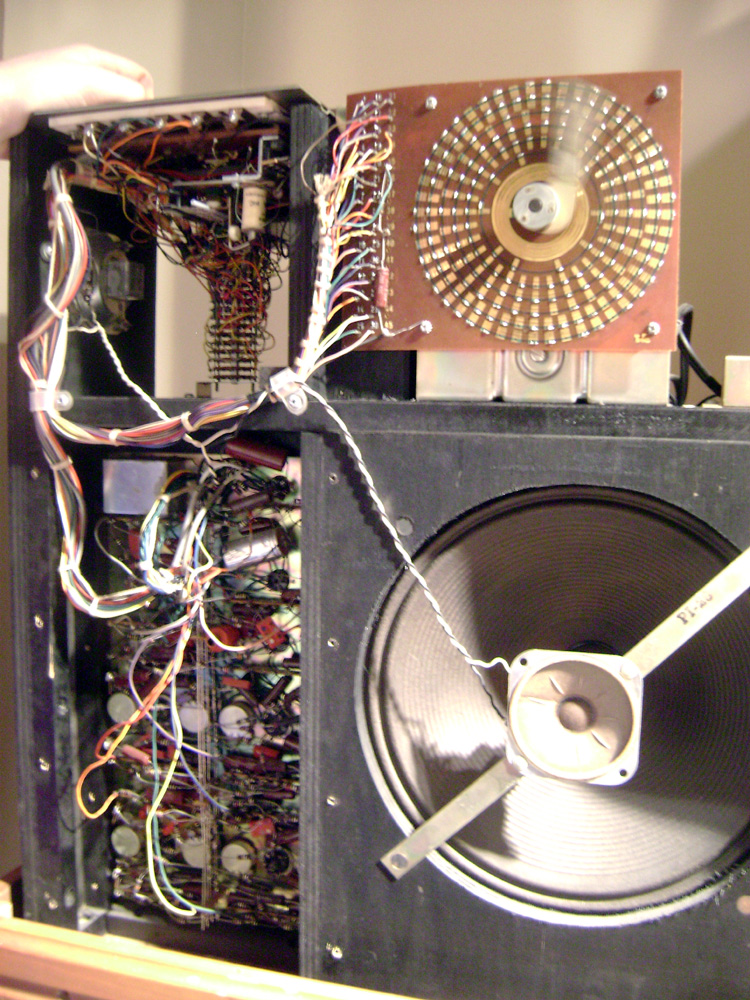

Drum machine
(1959–)

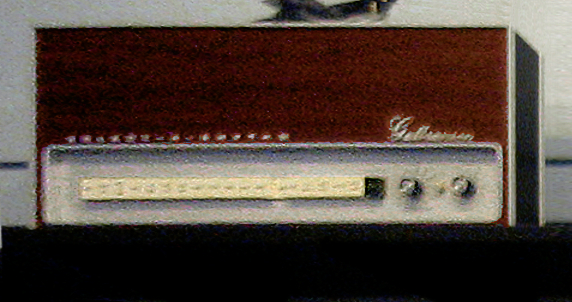

Transistorized drum machine (1964–)

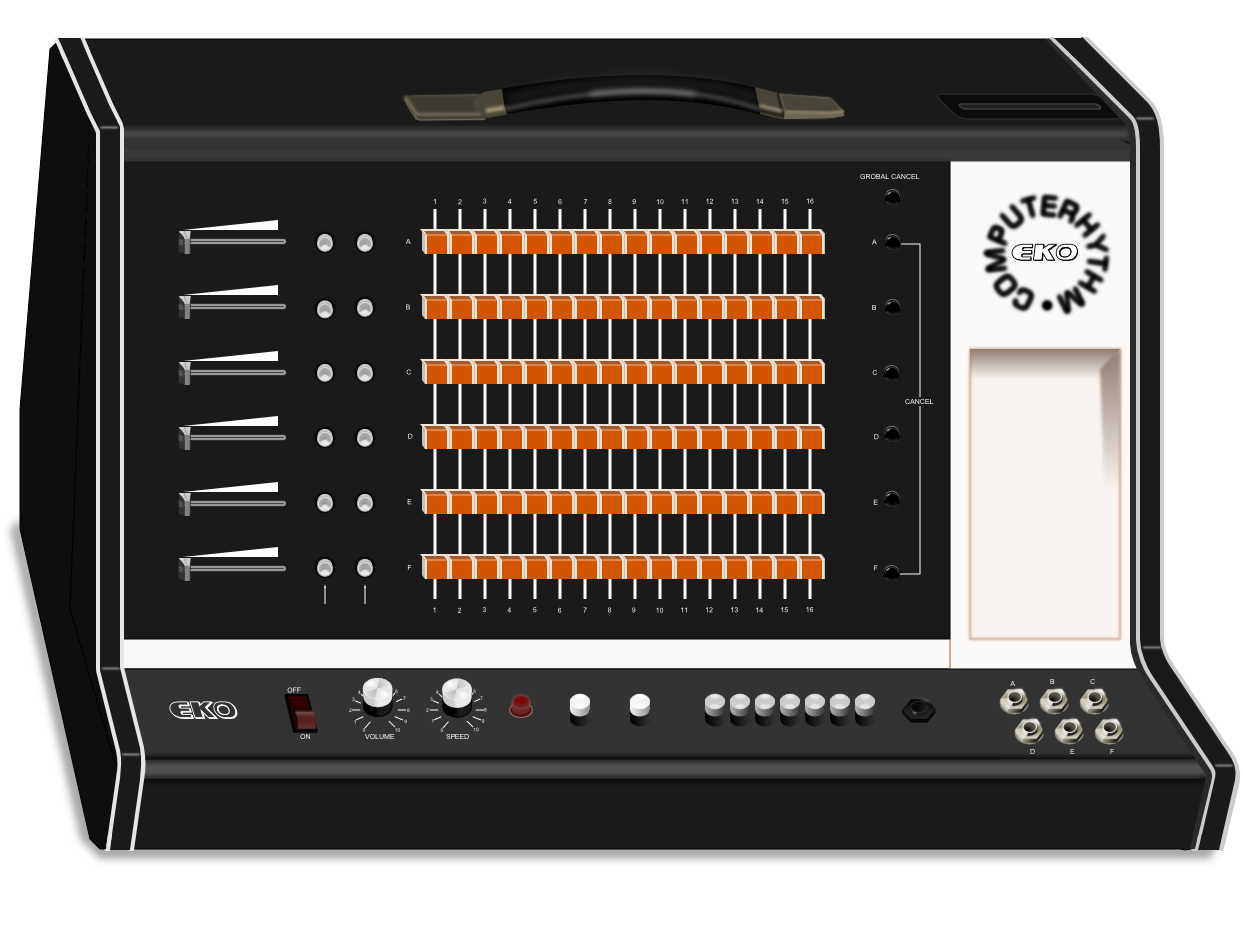

Step drum machine (1972–)

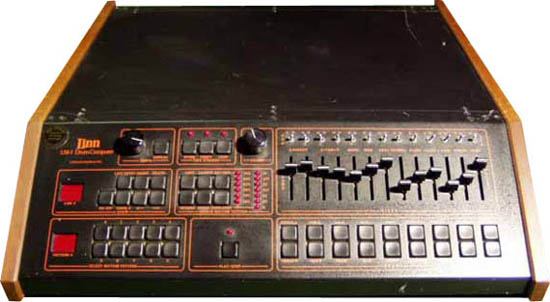

Digital drum machine (1980–)

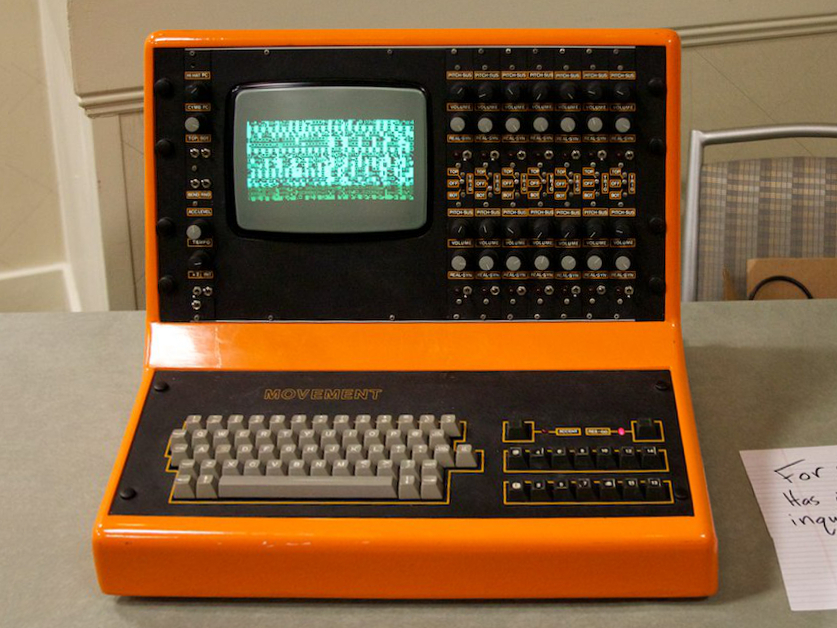

Groove machine (1981–)

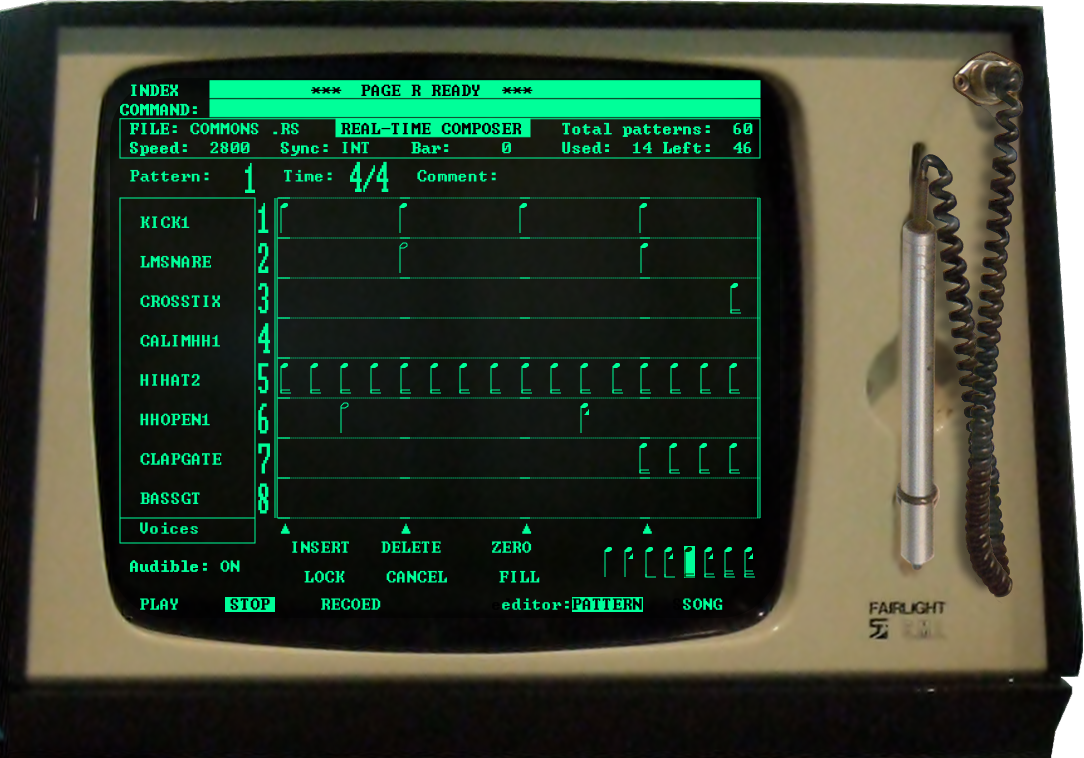

"Page R" on Fairlight (1982)

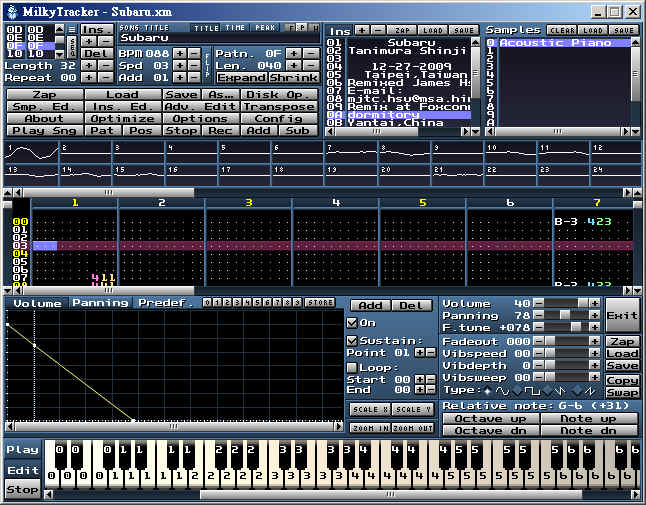

Tracker (1987–)

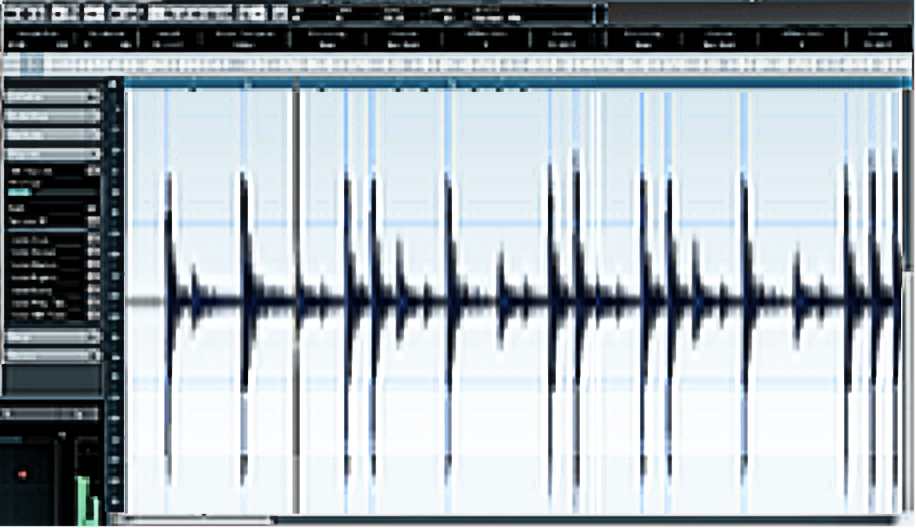

Beat slicer (1990s–)

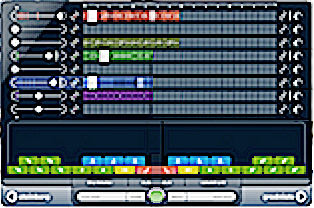

Loop sequencer (1998–)

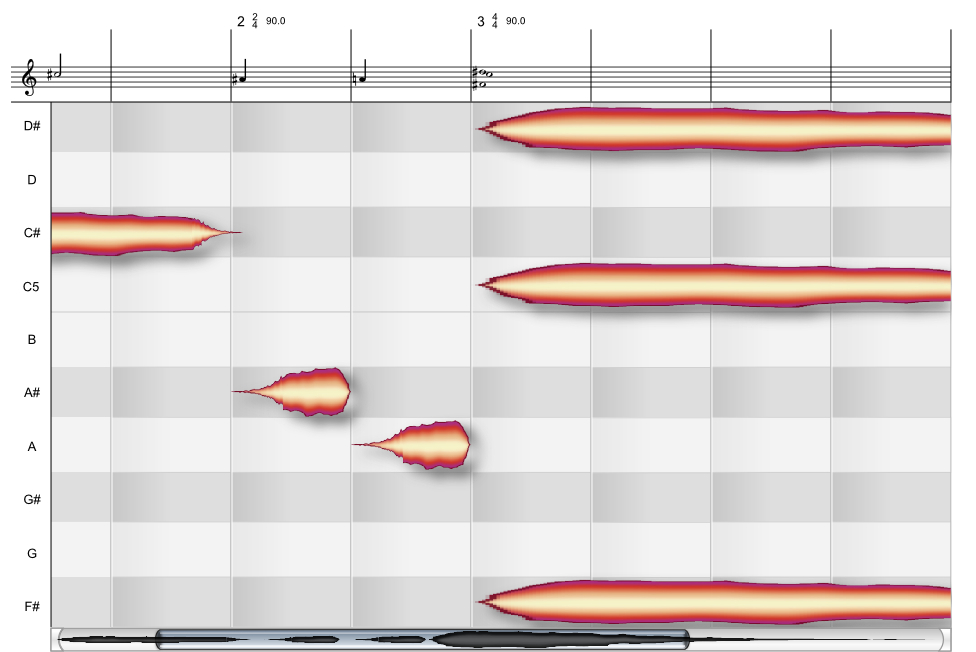

Note manipulation on audio tracks (2009–)

== See also ==
- Combination action § Sequencers (for organs)
- Groovebox
- List of music sequencers
- List of music software
- Music tracker
- Music workstation
