= Beat slicing =

Process of slicing drumloop audio, separating different drum hits

Beat slicing is the process of using computer software to cut an audio file of a drumloop in smaller sections, separating different drumhits. This is employed to rearrange the beat with either a sequencer or play them with a sampler, with the results ranging from changing particular hits to completely rearranging the flow of the beat.

Slicing a beat also allows the tempo of the beat to be altered heavily in music sequencers, without resulting downsides such as the pitch being increased or decreased.

This process is the most prominent in genres of drum and bass, hip-hop, glitch, and IDM, the two latter being notorious for their prominent artists rearranging and altering beats in extreme ways.

== Common programs used for beat slicing ==
- Ableton Live
- BeatCleaver
- ReCycle
- Renoise
- Reaktor
- Max/MSP
- FL Studio
