= ReBirth RB-338 =

Software synthesizer

ReBirth
- A ReBirth file, running the program's default GUI.
- Developer: Propellerhead Software
- Stable release: 2.0.1 / September 1998 iPhone OS / April 2010
- Operating system: Microsoft Windows 98 and higher, Mac OS 8, Mac OS 9, iOS
- Type: Software synthesizer
- Website: reasonstudios.com

ReBirth RB-338 is a software synthesizer for Microsoft Windows, Mac OS 8-9 and iOS for the iPhone, iPod Touch and iPad. It was developed by Propellerhead Software, and its first alpha version (for Mac OS) was publicly released in October 1996. Propellerhead Software ceased developing the original program in January 1999. Support for desktop versions was officially discontinued in September 2005. Shortly afterward, the ReBirth Museum Web site was launched and the last desktop version's (2.0.1) disk image was made available as a free download and torrent. Propellerhead Software continues to develop other software relating to dance-oriented computer-based music composition, including Reason, its flagship software synthesizer, as well as portable "app" versions of ReBirth.

== Features ==
ReBirth emulates two Roland TB-303 synthesizers and a Roland TR-808 since v1.0, and also a Roland TR-909 drum machine since v2.0. All emulations can be used simultaneously. Each of the emulated devices has its own pattern selector, a feature the original devices are lacking. This allows fast switches between different musical sequences, and re-programming the TB-303 for playing different notes, for instance, is rendered unnecessary. This feature has been adopted in some of Reason's devices. ReBirth also features mixers, a pattern controlled filter (PCF) and some of the standard effects in software synthesizers like delay, compressor and distortion.
The program also supports user modifications, which may replace the samples in the drum machine emulations and modify the GUI. There are four modifications included in the ReBirth installation by default (though the default ReBirth GUI seems to count as a modification as well).

The virtual knobs and controls can be assigned to physical counterparts via MIDI, so knobs, modulation wheels, faders and other performance controls available on keyboards and modules can be used to shape the software sound.

== Critical reception ==
ReBirth was an early software synthesizer, pioneering this class of instruments along with Cubase, Cakewalk, Digital Performer, and Reality in 1997, with a low-CPU-utilization, leading the PC software market, with the low specs of then cutting-edge computers. The sound quality during live playback (as opposed to saving the generated sound to disk), assuming that the CPU could cope with the sampling rate, was imposed by the quality of the sound card.

Some enthusiasts have criticized ReBirth's software emulation of the TB-303 as being an inferior copy of the genuine sound. Such criticism is common to many software synths that emulate analog synthesis (which the TB-303 featured), due to the reputedly inimitable sound of analog synthesis, and quality degraded by low-end sound cards. Despite this, Roland contacted Propellerhead Software to give it an unofficial thumbs up, which Propellerhead considered to be the Roland seal of approval.

== Free download ==
As of September 2005, support for ReBirth was discontinued by Propellerhead software, and the software became available online as a free download.

== iPhone and iPad ==
In April 2010, ReBirth was re-released as a paid app for the iPhone and iPod Touch. In November 2010 a visually revamped and modernized version was made available on the iPad. Propellerhead disabled ReBirth For iOS on 1 June 2013. The app was officially removed from the App Store on 15 June 2017, following an official claim from Roland of intellectual property infringement.
