= Reason (software) =

Digital audio workstation

- Reason 13
- Developer: Reason Studios (a subsidiary of LANDR)
- Release: 22 November 2000; 25 years ago
- Stable release: 14 / 12 May 2026
- Operating system: Microsoft Windows, macOS
- Type: Digital audio workstation, audio plug-in
- License: Proprietary
- Website: www.reasonstudios.com

Reason is a digital audio workstation (DAW) and audio plug-in for macOS and Windows, developed by the Swedish company Reason Studios (formerly known as Propellerhead Software). Its interface is based on a virtual rack of hardware-style instruments, effects and mixers that are linked with virtual cables. Reason was first released in November 2000.

Propellerhead developed Reason after ending work on its earlier program ReBirth. Early versions could not record audio. Reason 6 (2011) added recording by absorbing Propellerhead's separate Record application, Reason 6.5 (2012) introduced Rack Extensions for instruments and effects made by third-party developers, and Reason 11 (2019) added the Reason Rack Plugin, which runs inside other DAWs. Reason is sold as a perpetual licence or by subscription, and a free plug-in edition, Reason Free, was released in 2026. In January 2026, the Montreal-based music creation company LANDR acquired Reason Studios, whose majority owner had been the investment firm Verdane.

Reviewers have praised Reason's workflow and built-in instruments, while questioning its price and its depth compared with other DAWs. Artists and producers who have used Reason include The Prodigy, MGMT and Skrillex.

== History ==
=== Background ===
Propellerhead Software was founded in Stockholm in 1994 by Ernst Nathorst-Böös, Pelle Jubel and Marcus Zetterquist. Its first product was ReCycle, a program for slicing sampled loops that it developed with Steinberg. The company drew wider attention from dance music producers in 1996, when it announced ReBirth RB-338, which MusicRadar later described as among the most significant virtual instruments in the history of electronic music. In 1998, ReBirth gained support for ReWire, a protocol developed with Steinberg that lets programs exchange audio and MIDI data.

As home computers became powerful enough for people to build complete studios in software, Propellerhead stopped developing ReBirth in 1999 to concentrate on a new program, Reason.

=== Releases ===
Reason was first released in November 2000. Early versions could not record audio or host third-party plug-ins; Propellerhead argued that ReWire let users combine Reason with other software for those tasks. In May 2009, Propellerhead announced a separate recording program, Record, designed to work alongside Reason, and released it that year. Reason 6, released in September 2011, combined the features of both programs, and Record was discontinued. Reason 6.5 (June 2012) introduced Rack Extensions, which let third-party developers create instruments and effects for the rack. Reason 9.5 (2017) added support for third-party VST plug-ins, which Propellerhead had previously chosen not to support.

In August 2019, Propellerhead Software changed its name to Reason Studios. Reason 11, released in September 2019, introduced the Reason Rack Plugin, which loads the rack's instruments and effects as plug-ins in other DAWs.

Major releases
Version	Released	Notable additions
Reason 1	November 2000	A rack containing the Subtractor synthesiser, Redrum drum machine, Dr. Rex and NN-19 samplers and eight effects
Reason 2	2002	NN-XT sampler; REX file support in all samplers; 24-bit sample playback
Reason 3	2005	Combinator, which saves a group of devices as a single patch
Reason 4	September 2007	Thor synthesiser, ReGroove Mixer and RPG-8 arpeggiator; reworked sequencer
Reason 5	August 2010	Kong Drum Designer, Dr. Octo Rex loop player and Blocks, a pattern-based arrangement tool; sampling of audio in the sampler devices
Reason 6	September 2011	Audio recording and the mixing console from Record; Pulveriser, The Echo and Alligator effects; 64-bit support
Reason 6.5	June 2012	Rack Extensions
Reason 7	April 2013	MIDI output; group and parallel mix channels; a spectrum analyser in each mixer channel
Reason 8	September 2014	Redesigned interface; new browser
Reason 9	June 2016	Player devices; Pitch Edit
Reason 10	October 2017	Europa wavetable synthesiser; Grain sample manipulator
Reason 11	September 2019	Reason Rack Plugin; six new devices
Reason 12	September 2021	High-resolution graphics; Mimic sampler; revised Combinator
Reason 13	June 2024	New browser; revised sequencer editing; five new devices
Reason 14	May 2026	Track Panel and Rack per Track; sequencer updates; RV-9 Reverb Station

=== Ownership ===
Verdane, an investment firm, held a majority stake in Reason Studios and had worked with the company since 2017. In January 2026, the Montreal-based music creation company LANDR acquired Reason Studios. Later that month, Reason Studios began selling the rack as a standalone plug-in and reduced the price of the DAW (see #Editions and licensing).

== Features ==
=== Rack, mixer and sequencer ===
Reason's main window has three parts: a rack, a mixer and a sequencer. The rack holds virtual instruments, effects and utilities, known as devices, which are drawn to resemble hardware units. The rack can be flipped around to show the rear panels, where the audio, MIDI and control voltage (CV) connections between devices are changed with virtual cables. A device added to the rack is connected automatically. The Combinator device groups several devices into one, with its own connections and a panel of macro controls, and saves them as a single patch.

The mixer is modelled on a hardware mixing console, with a channel strip for every instrument and audio channel and a master channel with a bus compressor. The sequencer records and edits MIDI and audio. Its tools include Blocks for arranging a song, the ReGroove mixer for adjusting the timing feel of parts, and time-stretching and pitch editing of audio. Reason 14 added a Track Panel to the sequencer, which shows the devices, signal chain, send levels and panning of the selected track, and Rack per Track, which gives each track its own rack column.

=== Instruments and effects ===
Reason's built-in devices include synthesisers such as Subtractor, Thor and Europa, samplers such as NN-19, NN-XT and Mimic, the Redrum and Kong drum machines, and effects such as reverbs, delays and distortion units. Players are devices that process or generate MIDI notes, for example as arpeggios or chords.

==== Subtractor and phase offset modulation ====
Subtractor's oscillators include a feature called phase offset modulation, which creates new waveforms from existing ones. When it is switched on, the oscillator makes a second copy of its waveform, shifts the copy's phase by an adjustable amount, and either subtracts the copy from the original or multiplies the two together. For example, subtracting a phase-shifted sawtooth wave from a sawtooth wave produces a pulse wave whose duty cycle depends on the size of the offset, and changing the offset over time produces pulse-width modulation. Other waveforms can be treated in the same way to produce more complex shapes. Sound on Sound distinguishes the effect from phase modulation, which is closely related to frequency modulation, and from the phase distortion used in Casio synthesisers.

=== Plug-ins and Rack Extensions ===
The rack can be expanded with Rack Extensions, a format introduced in Reason 6.5 for instruments and effects made by Reason Studios and independent developers. They are sold through an online store and work like built-in devices, with the same cabling, automation and patch browsing. Reason 13 supports VST2 and VST3 plug-ins, and a 2026 review noted that it does not support the Audio Units format.

Reason can also run inside other programs. The Reason Rack Plugin, introduced with Reason 11, loads the rack's instruments and effects in other DAWs as VST3, Audio Unit (AU) or AAX plug-ins. Before then, Reason could be used alongside other DAWs through ReWire.

=== Platforms and file support ===
Reason 14 runs on Windows 10 or later and on macOS 11 or later. According to a 2024 review, Reason supports unlimited audio and instrument tracks, sampling of live audio in its sampler devices, MIDI output to external instruments, synchronisation through Ableton Link, and common audio formats such as WAV, AIFF and MP3.

=== Hardware ===
Propellerhead's first hardware product was Balance, a USB audio interface with two inputs and two outputs, launched in September 2011 alongside Reason 6. It drew its power from the USB connection and was sold as a bundle with Reason Essentials. Its features included Clip Safe, a function for repairing clipped recordings, and a button that opens a floating input-level meter and tuner window in Reason.

== Editions and licensing ==
As of 2026, Reason is sold in two forms: Reason, the full DAW, which also includes the Reason Rack Plugin, and Reason Rack, a plug-in version without the standalone sequencer and mixer. Both can be bought as a perpetual licence or used through a subscription. Reason+ includes the DAW, the plug-in and additional content and services, and a separate Reason Rack subscription covers the plug-in alone. Reason Studios also sells additional instruments and sounds.

In January 2026, Reason Studios began selling Reason Rack as a standalone product for US$199 and reduced the price of the Reason DAW from US$499 to US$299. The Reason+ subscription also provides weekly sound packs and access to all of the company's devices, and from 2026 it includes tools for mastering and music distribution.

Earlier editions included Reason Essentials, a lower-priced edition introduced in 2011 as the successor to Record, and Reason Suite, which bundled the company's full collection of devices and had been discontinued by 2022. In August 2026, Reason Studios released Reason Free, a free version of the Reason Rack Plugin with 15 devices, and opened the Rack Extension marketplace to its users.

== Reception ==
Reviewing Reason 12 in 2021, MusicRadar said it was debatable how essential the update was for Reason 11 users but that Reason looked "the best it has in years". MusicTech found the release light on new features for long-time users, but called it a "brilliant buy" for producers looking for a new DAW. PCMag's 2022 review advised existing users to take a close look at the update, but said the interface had "aged considerably" compared with its competitors.

MusicRadar's 2024 review of Reason 13 praised its speed of composition and new devices such as Polytone and Ripley, but questioned whether its US$499 price would persuade users to change DAW. It also wrote that since Reason 11 the program had become more of an "instrument ecosphere" than a DAW. MusicTech named Reason 13's intuitive workflow, sound design and sequencing as strengths and suggested that users might keep their existing DAW and use Reason as a companion.

MusicTech's 2026 review of Reason 14, written by a long-time Cubase user, praised the rack and cabling system, the range of instruments and effects, and an efficient workflow. It said that Reason lacks the depth of competing DAWs in significant areas and described the subscription model as redundant, and it called the new Track Panel a welcome addition that other DAWs have long had.

== Notable users ==
Reason has been used by artists and producers in several genres. In electronic music, The Prodigy made much of Always Outnumbered, Never Outgunned with the program, and Skrillex, BT and Kshmr have also used it. Kshmr produced "Like a G6" by Far East Movement and "Tsunami" by DVBBS with the program.

Hip-hop and pop producers who have used Reason include DJ Mustard, Cool & Dre, J. Cole and Ian Kirkpatrick.

Among rock, indie and alternative acts, MGMT have said that "pretty much everything" on their debut album Oracular Spectacular was made with Reason's built-in synthesisers. LCD Soundsystem, Toro Y Moi, the Beastie Boys and Todd Rundgren have also used the program.

ConcernedApe, the creator of the video game Stardew Valley, has said that the game's entire soundtrack was made with Reason.

== See also ==
- List of music software
