= Reason Studios =

Swedish music software company

- Formerly: Propellerhead Software
- Type: Private
- Industry: Music software
- Founded: 1994
- Founder: Ernst Nathorst-Böös, Marcus Zetterquist and Peter Jubel
- Headquarters: Stockholm, Sweden
- Products: Reason, Reason Rack Plugin, Reason Free, Reason+, ReCycle, ReBirth RB-338
- Parent: LANDR (2025–present)
- Website: reasonstudios.com

Logotype used from 1994 to 2019

Reason Studios (formerly Propellerhead Software) is a Swedish music software company headquartered in Stockholm. Founded in 1994, it develops music-production software, including the digital audio workstation (DAW) Reason and its collection of virtual instruments and effects. Reason is also available as a plug-in for use inside other DAWs. The company's software has been used in hip-hop, electronic and indie music production.

The company's first product was ReCycle, a tool for editing audio loops, followed by the synthesizer and drum-machine emulation ReBirth RB-338. It released Reason in 2000 and changed its name from Propellerhead Software to Reason Studios in 2019. LANDR acquired the company in 2025, with the deal publicly announced in January 2026; Reason Studios continued operating under its own name after the acquisition.

== History ==
Propellerhead Software was founded in 1994 by Ernst Nathorst-Böös, Marcus Zetterquist and Peter Jubel. Its first release, ReCycle, was a sample-loop editor that let users change the tempo of an audio loop without changing its pitch. It stored loop data in the company's REX file format and was marketed with Steinberg as a companion to the Cubase music software.

In 1997, the company released ReBirth RB-338, a step sequencer that emulated Roland's TB-303 bass synthesizer and TR-808 drum machine. A TR-909 drum machine was added in version 2.0. In 1998, Propellerhead and Steinberg introduced ReWire, a protocol for synchronizing audio and data between music applications. ReWire was later made available for use by third-party developers.

The company released Reason in 2000. The software presented a virtual recording studio built around a rack of instruments and effects connected by virtual cables, along with a sequencer for arranging and recording music. In 2009, Propellerhead released Record, a separate recording and mixing application designed to work with Reason. Its recording and mixing features were incorporated into Reason 6 in 2011, after which Record was discontinued.

In 2012, the company introduced Rack Extensions, a platform that allowed third-party developers to make instruments and effects for use inside Reason. Propellerhead added support for VST plug-ins in Reason 9.5 in 2017. In August 2019, it announced that it would change its name to Reason Studios. Reason 11 introduced the Reason Rack Plugin, allowing Reason instruments and effects to be used in other DAWs; the same version discontinued ReWire support. Support for VST3 plug-ins was added in December 2022, and native support for Apple silicon processors followed in Reason 12.6.

In 2025, LANDR, a Montreal-based music-production platform, acquired Reason Studios; the deal was publicly announced in January 2026. The acquisition ended the investment of Verdane, which had partnered with the company's management in 2017. Reason Studios continued operating under its own brand. The companies said they planned to integrate Reason products more closely with LANDR's music-production services, expand access to Reason Rack for users of other DAWs, and increase customer support and research and development. They also announced plans for an Artist Council of producers and longtime Reason users to advise on product development.

== Name ==
Propellerhead Software changed its name to Reason Studios in August 2019, aligning the company name with its main product, Reason. The company is unrelated to the British electronic music duo Propellerheads.

== Products ==
=== Reason ===
Reason
- Developer: Reason Studios
- Stable release: 14.1.0
- Operating system: macOS, Microsoft Windows
- Type: Digital audio workstation
- License: Proprietary
- Website: www.reasonstudios.com/en/reason

Reason is a digital audio workstation for macOS and Windows. First released in 2000, it combines a sequencer and mixer with virtual instruments, samplers, drum machines and effects arranged in a virtual rack. Users can connect devices with virtual cables and create multiple instances of instruments and effects, limited by the computer's processing capacity.

Reason 14, released in May 2026, introduced a redesigned track-focused workflow, changes to the sequencer and the RV-9 Reverb Station effect. Version 14.1.0 added further improvements and bug fixes.

=== Reason Rack, Reason Free and Reason+ ===
Reason Rack Plugin makes Reason's virtual instruments and effects available inside other DAWs as plug-ins in VST3, Audio Units and AAX formats. It became available as a separate product in January 2026.

In August 2026, the company introduced Reason Free, a free version of the Reason Rack with 15 instruments, effects and utilities, including Europa, Kong and Scream 4. It runs as a plug-in inside compatible DAWs and can also be used as a standalone music application with up to 16 tracks.

Reason+ is the company's subscription service for Reason software and related music-making content. It launched in January 2021.

=== Other software and technologies ===
ReCycle is an audio-loop editor that uses the REX format to divide loops into slices so that they can be adjusted to a different tempo. ReBirth RB-338, released in 1997, emulated electronic instruments associated with Roland, including the TB-303 and TR-808. Propellerhead later released an iOS version of ReBirth in collaboration with Retronyms.

The company also developed the ReFill sound-library format for storing sounds, patches and instrument configurations, and Remote, a protocol for communication between control surfaces and Reason. ReWire, the earlier inter-application audio and synchronization protocol developed with Steinberg, was discontinued in Reason 11 when Reason Rack became available as a plug-in for other DAWs.

== Influence ==
Reason and its predecessors have been used by producers and musicians in hip-hop, electronic and indie music. In a review of Reason 6.5, Computer Music said the software had changed desktop music production. Sound on Sound and Future Music have also discussed the influence of ReBirth RB-338 on the adoption of software instruments in electronic music.
