= LANDR =

Cloud-based music creation platform

- Developer: MixGenius
- Website: www.landr.com

LANDR Audio is a cloud-based music creation platform developed by MixGenius, an artificial intelligence company based in Montreal, Quebec. Since launching with its flagship automated mastering service in 2014, LANDR has expanded its offerings to include distribution services, a music samples library, virtual studio technology (VSTs) and plug-ins, a service marketplace for musicians, and online video conferencing.

== History ==
MixGenius launched an automated mastering service in 2014 under the name LANDR, meant to represent the left and right audio channels. The engine, developed through several years, was built by analyzing thousands of mastered tracks and by doing research and analysis on the workflows of mastering engineers. The engine performs the standard mastering processes, such as equalization, dynamic compression, audio excitement or saturation, and limiting/maximizing.

The company, now mainly referred to as LANDR Audio, continues to add services to their platform with the goal of bridging the gap between DIY musicians and the professional music market under CEO Pascal Pilon.

LANDR has also created educational materials to help musicians improve their music production skills. Their educational content is disseminated through their blog, social media, and YouTube channel.

In January 2026, it was announced that LANDR had acquired Reason Studios, a Stockholm-based developer of music production software. Under the terms of the deal, Reason Studios continued to operate under its existing brand following the acquisition.

=== Product timeline ===
- 2014: AI mastering
- 2017: Music distribution
- 2018: Music samples library
- 2019: Rent-to-own VSTs and plug-ins
- 2020: Collaboration tools & services marketplace
- 2021: Proprietary VSTs and plug-ins

== Products and services ==
=== AI Mastering ===
Traditional audio mastering is a post-production process intended to prepare recorded audio for distribution by adjusting elements such as loudness, dynamic range, and tonal balance. LANDR provides an automated mastering service that applies algorithmic processing to uploaded audio files. According to the company, the system analyses characteristics of a track - such as frequency content and dynamics - and applies a sequence of audio processing steps intended to approximate aspects of conventional mastering workflows. Users may select from a set of presets or adjust available parameters before exporting the mastered audio. The service supports multiple file formats, including WAV, and allows batch processing for multi-track projects.

=== Music distribution ===
LANDR Distribution allows users to release and monetize their music on digital streaming platforms like Spotify, Apple Music, and TikTok. LANDR users can currently distribute to 70 digital service providers (DSPs) and aggregators resulting in a full stable of over 150 digital streaming stores and platforms. LANDR has also been named a preferred partner of both Apple Music and Spotify since 2020.

=== Audio samples ===
The curated library hosts over one million samples from various third-party providers and is updated weekly with new content.

The Samples marketplace also hosts AI-led tools to help users search and preview samples in context. Selector suggests complementary samples to users as they browse. Creator, a browser-based audio interface, allows users to preview and play with samples while they browse the library. Tracks made with Creator can also be shared directly to TikTok.

In 2021, LANDR launched a proprietary Samples plug-in to allow users to browse and preview the Samples library from within their preferred digital audio workstation (DAW).

=== VSTs & plug-ins ===
LANDR hosts a variety of free, subscription-based, and rent-to-own VSTs and plug-ins for DAWs. The rent-to-own program allows users to pay a monthly fee over a set period of time before owning their product license outright.

=== Network and marketplace ===
Aimed at music professionals and DIY creators alike, the LANDR Network service marketplace allows users to create profiles, upload music, and connect with fellow artists and professionals to buy and sell their services. It also offers online collaboration tools like Sessions, video conferencing that allows users to sync and share DAW audio, and Projects, a collaborative, online workspace.

== Reception ==
LANDR won the Technovation Award at Canadian Music Week in 2014 and has continued to grow in popularity since. The company was number 18 on CNBC's February 28, 2017 edition of their "Upstart 25" lists.

In a Pitchfork feature about mastering, Jordan Kisner noted that responses from users of LANDR were mixed, reasoning that they found the site's technology to not be "flexible or intelligent" and that "You get what you pay for: a computer algorithm, rather than a live engineer with taste and experience." However, despite hesitancy from the community to embrace artificial intelligence in music production spaces, LANDR received positive feedback from industry leaders like Bob Weir (Grateful Dead), Tiga, and Nas. Notably, the engine was utilized by Gwen Stefani’s team at the 2016 Grammys, cementing its place as a professional audio production tool.
