= Beta Monkey Music =

Beta Monkey Music is a company, based in New Haven, Connecticut since 2002, that develops drum loops and drum samples for use in audio software and hardware. They are known for several product lines including the Drum Werks, Double Bass Mania, Jazz Essentials, Odd Time Meltdown, Rock Hard Funk, and Pure Country series of drum loops and drum samples. For use on Mac and Windows audio platforms, the soundware products are designed for use by songwriters and have been used worldwide since introduction in 2002.

Beta Monkey Music has been reviewed with acclaim by music magazines worldwide, including Electronic Musician, ReMix, Music Tech, Sound on Sound, and Recording Magazines.

Beta Monkey Music began offering musicians an alternative to sample libraries and to produce genre content not offered by the music sample industry. Beta Monkey quickly evolved and has developed over 50 drum sample libraries for multiple styles of music including rock, alt rock, heavy metal, blues, country, fusion, jazz, and world music.
