= ReCycle =

Music loop editor

- Developer: Propellerhead Software
- Initial release: 1994
- License: Proprietary
- Website: www.propellerheads.se/products/recycle/index.cfm?fuseaction=mainframe

ReCycle is a music loop editor designed and developed by Swedish software developers Propellerhead Software. It runs on Microsoft Windows and Apple Macintosh based PCs. The software debuted in 1994.

The principal idea of ReCycle is to alter the tempo of a music loop without changing its pitch or otherwise altering its sound. ReCycle does this by "slicing" loops into a series of separate "beats" or "hits" and altering their timing (or even quantizing them) without altering the length of the individual slices, thus allowing the loop to play at a different speed whilst using the unmodified sounds for each individual slice/drum hit, a process which fully preserves the original pitch of the loop while allowing a great variety of speed/timing tweaks. ReCycle can also assign each successive slice to a respective MIDI note on a scale. ReCycle was the first program to popularize the idea of loop slicing.

Propellerhead developed their own file format for this software: REX, and later REX2 (.RX2) adding support for stereo files, which has become a standard for music loops and is compatible with many third party programs, including Logic Pro, MOTU Digital Performer, and Steinberg Cubase. Propellerhead's Reason has its own specialised REX2 playing device called the Dr. Octorex Loop Player. In versions prior to Reason 5.0, it was supported in the Dr.REX Loop Player. This device can play slices when requested or simply play the entire loop in sequence.

ReCycle was originally developed in conjunction with Steinberg, although version 2 was solely a Propellerhead release.

An update to ReCycle, version 2.2, was released in October 2011. It adds 64-bit support as well as no longer requiring Rosetta on OS X (as it was removed in OS X 10.7). It also removed support for older file formats such as Sound Designer II, Mixman, SampleCell and Akai (.aka) files.

== See also ==
- Beat slicing
