= Studio Pro =

Digital audio workstation

- Studio Pro version 8 song page
- Original authors: Matthias Juwan, Wolfgang Kundrus
- Developers: Fender, PreSonus
- Release: 27 September 2009; 16 years ago
- Stable release: 8.0.2 / 3 March 2026; 6 months ago
- Operating system: Microsoft Windows, macOS, Linux (beta)
- Available in: 9 languages
- List of languages English, German, Spanish, French, Italian, Portuguese, Japanese, Chinese, Korean
- Type: Digital audio workstation
- License: Commercial proprietary software
- Website: fender.com/products/fender-studio-pro

Studio Pro (formerly known as Studio One Pro) is a digital audio workstation (DAW) application, used to create, record, mix and master music and other audio, with functionality also available for video. Initially developed as a successor to the KRISTAL Audio Engine, it was acquired by PreSonus and first released under the name Studio One in 2009 for macOS and Microsoft Windows. PreSonus and Studio One were then acquired by Fender in 2021, which led to the product's rebranding as Fender Studio Pro in 2026.

Since 2024, users who purchase and register a copy of Studio Pro receive a permanent license for the software, alongside one year of subsequent feature updates. It is also available as part of the Studio One Pro+ monthly subscription program.

== History ==
=== Studio One early development and release (2004–2011) ===
Studio Pro originally began development under the name K2, as a follow-up to the KRISTAL Audio Engine. Although development for this follow-up began in 2004, it transitioned in 2006 to a cooperation between PreSonus and KristalLabs Software Ltd., a start-up founded by former Steinberg employees Wolfgang Kundrus and Matthias Juwan. Kundrus was one of the developers for initial versions of Cubase, and established concepts for the first version of Nuendo. Juwan was the author of the original KRISTAL Audio Engine, wrote the specification for version 3 of the VST plug-in standard, and had also worked on multiple Steinberg products, including Cubase, Nuendo, and HALion.

KristalLabs then became part of PreSonus in 2009, at which point the software was renamed to Studio One. The former KristalLabs logo was used as the basis for the Studio One logo.

The first version of Studio One was announced on 1 April 2009 at Musikmesse, and released on 27 September 2009. The final update for version 1 (v1.6.5) was released in July 2011.

=== Versions 2 & 3 (2011–2018) ===
Version 2 of Studio One was announced on 17 October 2011, and released on 31 October 2011 (alongside the 2.0.2 update). This release of the software introduced multiple enhancements, including integration with Celemony Melodyne, transient detection & quantization, groove extraction, multi-track comping, folder tracks, multi-track MIDI editing, an updated browser, and new plug-ins.

The integration of Studio One version 2 with Melodyne was achieved via the creation of a new plug-in extension, known as Audio Random Access (ARA). This extension, developed jointly by PreSonus and Celemony, allows an audio plug-in to appear as an integrated part of the application.

Version 3 of Studio One was released on 20 May 2015. The new features included an arranger track, scratchpads for idea experimentation, the ability to chain together different effects and instruments, MIDI note effects, new plug-ins, and the ability to use curves in automation.

=== Versions 4 & 5 (2018–2022) ===
Following teaser images on social media websites in the preceding weeks, version 4 of Studio One was announced via a YouTube live stream event on 22 May 2018, and released simultaneously. New features in version 4 included a chord track (with chord detection, transposition and chord substitution options), a dedicated drum editing interface, expanded drum machine & sampler plug-ins, AAF-format import/export functionality (to exchange data with other DAW applications), and support for version 2 of the ARA plug-in extension.

Almost exactly a year later, on 21 May 2019, this functionality was expanded further with the live stream announcement and simultaneous release of version 4.5. New functionality introduced with version 4.5 included input channel gain staging and phase/polarity options, a built-in plug-in manager, M4A (AAC/ALAC) support, video export options, new grouping options, RMS metering, pre-fader metering, CPU multi-core optimization, and expanded macro features, alongside a new add-on for batch audio conversion & processing.

The release of version 4.6 was preceded by a launch party event, hosted by PreSonus at the Red Bull Studios building in London. Its release on 10 December 2019 included a re-designed and expanded version of the Ampire guitar amplifier and effects plugin (including new effects pedal options), a re-designed content browser, and new templates & macros for podcast production.

Version 5 of Studio One, described as "ten years in the making", was announced via live-stream video on 7 July 2020. Features added in this new version included a full score editor (with features similar to that of PreSonus' notation software, Notion), a show interface focused on supporting live performances, MIDI support enhancements (such as polyphonic expression, custom ROLI device support, and the ability to use MTC & MMC to synchronize Studio One with external clocks). Version 5 also added support for recording in 64-bit floating-point WAV format, bringing the maximum precision for recording & processing to 64-bit/384 kHz and thereby making Studio One one of the highest-resolution audio production and mastering applications available. Version 5.4 of the software, released in September 2021, added native support for Apple computers with Apple silicon chips, thereby providing improved performance on such machines (which would previously have run the application via Rosetta 2 emulation).

=== Versions 6 & 7 (2022–2026) ===
Version 6 of the software (the first following PreSonus' acquisition by Fender in 2021) was both announced and released on 29 September 2022. The new release included enhancements focused on making the application "simpler [and] more intuitive" (as previously alluded to by Fender CEO, Andy Mooney), such as "smart" templates, additional UI customization, song lyric support, and cloud-based collaboration (via their PreSonus Sphere subscription service). Following the launch, Evan Jones, Fender CMO, stated that the company was "fully invested in supporting the continued expansion and adoption of Studio One as the total solution for professional and committed at-home creators." In addition, version 6 introduced a video track with basic editing tools.

Subsequently, version 6.5, released on 26 September 2023, introduced support for spatial audio mixing and Dolby Atmos, as well as import and export support for the new open-source DAWproject file format which, at time of release, was also supported by Bitwig Studio. This version also added Linux support to Studio One for the first time, in the form of a public beta.

In September 2024, it was announced that version 7 of Studio One would be released on October 9th. The announcement also confirmed that the lower-priced Artist and free Prime editions of the software would no longer be offered, shifting instead to "one DAW for all," specifically called Studio One Pro.

PreSonus' general software manager, Arnd Kaiser, described version 7 as an iteration which "breaks down the barriers between different workflows..." A number of the release's features included aspects augmented by artificial intelligence, including stem extraction, enhanced tempo-detection, and full integration with the Splice platform and it's AI-powered search features (making Studio One the first DAW to implement this integration). Other features included within this version on initial release included dynamic song-wide transposition, looping for both audio & MIDI events, a dynamic grid of loops and patterns (known as the Launcher), and support for the open-source CLAP plug-in format.

=== Version 8: Fender Studio Pro (2026–present) ===
Alongside the first announcement of Studio One version 7 in September 2024, PreSonus also announced multiple changes to the software's release model, which were made as a "direct result of user feedback." They stated that, "to deliver more major new features, faster, as soon as they’re ready," they would be moving to "a faster feature release cycle with multiple major new feature releases each year." Because of this change, Studio One 7 was stated to be the final numbered release, with future versions using time-based naming conventions.

To support the change in release schedule, it was announced that each perpetual license of Studio One Pro would "include one full year of new feature releases from the time of registration," so that users can "upgrade [their] licence on [their] schedule ... without worrying about the timing of major releases."

On January 13, 2026, it was announced that the latest version of the software was being released under the new name of Fender Studio Pro; however, despite the previous confirmation, it retained the numbered release model, releasing as version 8 of the application. Acknowledging that the change to a more guitar-focused name might be alienating for some established Studio One users, Max Gutnik, Fender’s CPO, said that "There will definitely be some hot takes on the name. We're sure about that, but we understand it. You know, PreSonus is a really loved brand, and we love it too."

With the release coinciding with new Fender hardware and an update to its Fender Studio mobile app, allowing real-time Wi-Fi integration with Studio Pro, the company described the products as a "connected music ecosystem." Alongside an uplifted user interface, version 8 introduced audio-to-MIDI transformation capabilities, new Fender-branded amp and effects pedal plug-ins, and a 'Chord Assistant' tool, to recommend chord progressions.

== Features ==
=== Standard DAW features ===
In addition to its other functionality, Studio Pro includes fundamental features which are common across most digital audio workstation software, such as the functionality found in multi-track recorders and audio mixing consoles, plus additional functions not possible with analog recording (such as undoing previous actions, editing without loss of information, use of virtual instruments, etc.).

Studio Pro has no fixed limits on the number of inputs/outputs, tracks, and buses available to users. Its audio engine supports 64-bit audio resolution with sample rates up to 768 kHz.

=== Supported formats, plug-ins, and standards ===
Studio Pro features support for importing & exporting multiple audio and video file formats, including WAV/AIFF, M4A (AAC/ALAC), FLAC/MP3, DDP, and MPEG‑4/M4V (using H.264/AVC and HEVC). For third-party plug-in support, it is compatible with the VST/VST2/VST3, Audio Unit, CLAP, and ReWire formats, plus the ARA/ARA2 plug-in extension (allowing plug-ins to closely integrate as part of the application).

Other standards supported by the software include MIDI Polyphonic Expression / Poly Pressure, spatial audio mixing (including Apple Spatial Audio and Dolby Atmos, up to 9.1.6 channels), and MTC/MMC (to synchronize with external clocks). To enable connectivity with third-party hardware, Studio Pro supports integration with Native Instruments Komplete Kontrol series keyboards, plus the Mackie Control Universal communications protocol (which combines functionality from Mackie Control, Logic Control and HUI), for interfacing with audio control surfaces.

Additionally, Studio Pro includes support for the importing & exporting of open-source DAWproject (.dawproject) files, to exchange project information with other DAW applications.

=== Non-audio tracks ===
In addition to the traditional audio and MIDI-focused tracks found in digital audio workstations, Studio Pro includes additional types of track which users can place within their songs & projects, to synchronize other key information with the same timeline. These include a dedicated video track (with video export functionality), a chord track (with automatic chord detection from audio or MIDI tracks, and options for chord transposition and substitution), an arranger track (for navigating song sections and re-arranging them via drag-and-drop), and a lyrics track (for attaching song lyrics to notes, either word by word or syllable by syllable).

=== Song, Project, and Show workflows ===
In addition to its standard song workflow, which most closely resembles a typical DAW, Studio Pro also provides two additional workflows and dedicated user interfaces for specific focus areas: A project interface, with tools for mastering, managing the metadata of, and exporting one or more songs simultaneously, including options for creating Red Book Standard CDs or disk images, and a show interface, focused on performance rather than creation, for use in coordinating all aspects of live performances from a single location. Both of these alternative interfaces support direct integration with Studio Pro's standard .song file format.

=== Scratch Pad and Launcher panels ===
Studio Pro has several panels that function alongside the traditional, linear timeline view common across DAWs: Scratch pads allow users to experiment with different song layouts without impacting the original version, whereas the launcher is a dynamic grid of audio and/or MIDI loops & patterns, with real-time editing features. Both of these panels allow their content to be extracted back to the main timeline.

=== Artificial intelligence features ===
Multiple aspects of Studio Pro functionality are supported by artificial intelligence (AI), such as audio tempo detection (including for free-tempo recordings) powered by neural network technology, AI-powered un-mixing to extract stems (such as vocals, bass, and drums) from a combined audio track (to allow separate processing on each), and full integration with Splice for browsing & previewing of royalty-free samples, including via its AI-powered sample search.

=== Other features ===
The other core features of Studio Pro include the following:

- Integrated Celemony Melodyne.
- Audio transient detection and real-time audio time-stretching features.
- Dynamic global transposition options for all chosen audio & MIDI tracks within a song, allowing for simple key changes.
- Integrated music score editor and side-by-side support for Notion.
- Multiple automation patterns for tracks and plug-ins, including straight lines, exponential/parabolic curves, and square/triangle/sine waves.
- Looping functionality for both audio and MIDI events, offering an alternative to duplicating them.
- A batch-audio interface, for processing multiple files simultaneously.
- The ability to create chains of virtual instruments and/or effects.
- Support for custom user-defined macros.
- MIDI note-level effects, such as an arpeggiator and a chord generator.
- A dedicated interface for editing programmed drums, including configurable kit piece names for each note pitch.
- Mix Engine effects: plug-ins that can be used to modify/bypass/replace the standard mixing processes for a specific bus/channel.
- Support for users to switch to the keyboard shortcuts from other DAW software, such as Pro Tools, Logic Pro, Cubase, and Sonar.
- Ability to directly upload mastered songs to SoundCloud and TuneCore.

=== Studio One Pro+ ===
In addition to perpetual licenses, the software is also available as part of the Studio One Pro+ monthly subscription program (previously known as PreSonus Sphere), which also includes other PreSonus software, such as Notion, and all of its available plug-ins.

=== Add-ons ===
Introduced with version 2.6.2 in January 2014, add-ons are optional items, developed either by PreSonus, or by third-parties, which can be acquired separately from the PreSonus store to expand the capabilities of Studio Pro. This can include new functionality (often known as extensions), plug-ins, virtual instrument presets, loops, and other assets. Example add-on functionality includes the Audio Batch Converter (released alongside version 4.5), which allows for the offline conversion and processing of multiple audio files simultaneously, including the use of both native and third-party plug-ins.

=== Studio One Remote ===
A mix window in Studio One Remote.

Introduced alongside Studio One version 3 in 2015, Studio One Remote is an app for wirelessly controlling the application via a tablet device connected to the same network. Whilst originally released for the Apple iPad, Remote was subsequently released for Microsoft Windows & Surface tablets (February 2016), and for Android tablets (June 2017). It uses PreSonus' own UCNET protocol, which is used for network connectivity and remote control across multiple PreSonus products.

Aspects of functionality which can be controlled via Remote include:

- The mixing console, including inserts, sends, inputs, outputs, and cue mixes.
- The transport bar and timeline ruler, including markers and arranger sections.
- Track macro controls.
- Plug-in parameters.

=== Studio One Exchange ===
Studio One Exchange (previously known as PreSonus Exchange when it was first released in January 2012, alongside version 2.0.4) is a service which allows registered users to exchange plug-in presets, MIDI files and other resources from directly within the application. The software's built-in Browser allows users to explore, preview, download, and review items uploaded to this service by other users, as well as upload their own.

A re-designed version of Exchange, referred to as Exchange 2.0 was released as part of Studio One v4.6 on 10 December 2019.

== Reception ==
Studio Pro has received mostly positive reviews since its initial release under the name of Studio One. Common areas of praise include rapid workflow, cost-effectiveness, and usability.

Studio One won the Japanese V.G.P. (Visual Grand Prix) Gold award for three consecutive years, in 2011, 2012, and 2013.

In 2012, readers of Resolution magazine named Studio One (version 2) as the Resolution Award winner in the DAW category.

In 2013, Studio One (version 2.5) won a M.I.P.A. (Musikmesse International Press Awards) award in the "Best Recording Software" category. Other awards received in 2013 included the Visual Grand Prix Audio Excellence award (in the DAW category), the ProSoundWeb & Live Sound International, Readers’ Choice Award, and Audio Media's "Gear of the Year" award, and the C.I.F. (Customers in Focus) award from the music studio website DAWfreak.se.

In 2016, Studio One (version 3) won Music and Sound Retailer's award for "Best Multitrack Recorder/Recording & Mixing Software of 2015" at NAMM.

== Release history ==
Year	Date	Version	Key features
2009	Version 1 (as Studio One)		
2009	27 September	1.0.0	Initial version.
2009	15 October	1.0.1	Usability improvements & bug fixes.
2009	2 December	1.0.2	Usability improvements & bug fixes.
2010	28 April	1.5.0	QuickTime video support, enhanced drag & drop functionality, REX2 file support, SoundCloud integration, enhanced automation, dynamic timestretching, MIDI improvements.
2010	23 June	1.5.1	MIDI recording offset.
2010	2 August	1.5.2	Bug fixes.
2010	28 September	1.6.0	Infinite nested buses, Mackie HUI support, VST 3.1 support.
2010	18 November	1.6.1	Usability improvements & bug fixes.
2011	3 January	1.6.2	Usability improvements & bug fixes.
2011	30 January	1.6.3	Usability improvements & bug fixes.
2011	9 March	1.6.4	Usability improvements & bug fixes.
2011	26 July	1.6.5	Usability improvements & bug fixes.
2011	Version 2		
2011	31 October	2.0.0	ARA support, Melodyne integration, transient detection & quantization, groove extraction, multi-track comping, folder tracks, multi-track MIDI editing, new plug-ins, updated browser.
2011	31 October	2.0.2	Bug fixes.
2011	13 December	2.0.3	Usability improvements & bug fixes.
2012	18 January	2.0.4	PreSonus Exchange integration.
2012	11 April	2.0.5	Ability to assign MIDI CC messages to any command, updated Ampire XT plug-in, playback stop marker, macro toolbar.
2012	12 June	2.0.6	Usability improvements & bug fixes.
2012	12 September	2.0.7	Usability improvements & bug fixes.
2012	2 December	2.5.0	Comping improvements, folder track editing, enhanced track transform, updated Ampire XT plug-in, enhanced automation, updated audio export, ability to re-record from buses.
2013	25 February	2.5.1	Ability to enable muted tracks in stem export, loop mode for Sample One plug-in.
2013	23 May	2.5.2	Bug fixes.
2013	29 August	2.6.0	Integration with StudioLive AI-series mixing consoles, integration with Nimbit, updated start page, Fat Channel plug-in, updated MIDI engine, displays for CD time and relative song position on the Project page.
2013	30 October	2.6.1	Bug fixes.
2014	23 January	2.6.2	Add-on support.
2014	15 July	2.6.3	Ability to drag & drop audio to third-party plug-ins, CAF file support, ability to drag & drop slices to the quantize grid.
2014	5 November	2.6.4	Increased recording buffer, 64-bit processing by default for Mac, stereo mode in Fat Channel plug-in.
2014	8 December	2.6.5	Support for new SoundCloud API.
2015	Version 3		
2015	20 May	3.0.0	Arranger track, scratchpads, updated browser, chains for effects & virtual instruments, note-level MIDI effects, macro controls, new plug-ins, automation curves, Studio One Remote.
2015	26 June	3.0.1	Updated manual, enhanced multi-touch.
2015	5 August	3.0.2	Studio One Prime edition.
2015	6 October	3.1.0	Integration with Studio 192 interfaces, option to colorize track controls.
2015	16 December	3.1.1	Plug-in search context menu, ability to filter hidden plug-ins from search, enlarged instrument channel output list.
2016	25 February	3.2.0	Mix engine effects, VCA faders.
2016	30 March	3.2.1	Pass-through mode for mix engine effects, mix engine effects for downstream buses, show/hide VCA targets.
2016	19 May	3.2.2	Usability improvements & bug fixes.
2016	9 June	3.2.3	Usability improvements & bug fixes.
2016	25 August	3.3.0	Ability to disable tracks / instruments / plug-ins, enhanced multi-track drum editing, MIDI editing improvements, single-click options for global effects on/off, Notion 6 integration, new video engine.
2016	6 September	3.3.1	Usability improvements & bug fixes.
2016	29 November	3.3.2	FaderPort 8 integration, ability to copy automation via copy/paste of events, ability to access QWERTY keyboard software device via Caps Lock key.
2016	19 December	3.3.3	Bug fixes.
2017	21 February	3.3.4	Usability improvements & bug fixes.
2017	23 May	3.5.0	Full mixer & plug-in undo, native low-latency software monitoring, updated CPU multi-processing, Fat Channel XT plug-in, file-independent track markers on the Project page, Project-level loudness metering.
2017	27 June	3.5.1	Reduced virtual instrument latency, updated CPU balancing, updated quick-zoom, updated mixer undo.
2017	26 September	3.5.2	Arranger track for Prime & Artist editions, updated song information window, blacklist for incompatible VST3 plug-ins.
2017	28 November	3.5.3	FaderPort 16 support.
2017	4 December	3.5.4	Bug fixes.
2018	30 January	3.5.5	Cakewalk Sonar shortcut setting.
2018	28 March	3.5.6	PreSonus Studio 1810 & 1824 support, PreSonus StudioLive III DAW remote support, macro option for channel renaming.
2018	Version 4		
2018	22 May	4.0.0	Chord track, chord detection/transposition/substitution, drum & pattern editors, expanded drum machine (Impact XT) & sampler (SampleOne XT) plug-ins, AAF-format import/export, import from existing songs, ARA version 2 support, new GUI customization options.
2018	10 July	4.0.1	Usability improvements & bug fixes, Studio One Prime version 4.
2018	13 September	4.1.0	Support for PreSonus ATOM Pad Controller, new Pipeline XT routing plug-in, tempo automation, new time scale tool for manual tempo mapping, expanded note repeat feature, expanded AAF export options.
2018	30 October	4.1.1	Usability improvements (including new features for the ATOM controller) & bug fixes.
2019	15 January	4.1.2	New incremental version save option, support for volume/gain automation in AAF export, bug fixes.
2019	22 January	4.1.3	Support for PreSonus' USB-C audio interfaces, bug fixes.
2019	26 March	4.1.4	Support for PreSonus' StudioLive S-Series mixing consoles, bug fixes.
2019	21 May	4.5.0	Input channel gain staging & polarity, plug-in manager, M4A (AAC/ALAC) support, video export, RMS metering, pre-fader metering, CPU multi-core optimization, macro expansions, batch audio conversion/processing add-on.
2019	29 May	4.5.1	Bug fixes.
2019	11 July	4.5.2	Usability improvements & bug fixes.
2019	3 September	4.5.3	Support for Native Instruments Komplete Kontrol MkII keyboards. Usability improvements & bug fixes.
2019	17 September	4.5.4	Bug fixes.
2019	19 November	4.5.5	Expanded FaderPort 8/16 support & bug fixes.
2019	10 December	4.6.0	Re-designed and Ampire guitar amplifier and effects plugin, new effects pedal plugin, re-designed content browser, new templates & macros for podcast production.
2020	21 January	4.6.1	Usability improvements & bug fixes.
2020	3 June	4.6.2	Expanded ARA functionality for chords (increasing compatibility with version 5 of Melodyne) and bug fixes.
2020	Version 5		
2020	7 July	5.0.0	Score editor, show page for live performances, polyphonic expression support, custom ROLI device support, support for recording in 64-bit floating-point WAV.
2020	11 August	5.0.1	Bug fixes.
2020	1 September	5.0.2	Bug fixes.
2020	20 October	5.1.0	Retrospective recording. Usability improvements & bug fixes.
2020	17 November	5.1.1	Support for PreSonus Revelator microphone. Usability improvements & bug fixes.
2021	19 January	5.1.2	Improved ARA integration for VocAlign, bug fixes.
2021	9 March	5.2.0	"Sound Variations" articulation management. "Sound Variation API" for communication between 3rd-party instruments and Studio One (in cooperation with Vienna Symphonic Library). Revised score view with drum notation and tabulature. New Studio One Remote features. Usability improvements.
2021	27 April	5.2.1	Bug fixes.
2021	29 June	5.3.0	Sound variations system enhancements. Conversion from chord track to note events.
2021	14 September	5.4.0	Native Apple silicon support. Performance optimizations for plug-ins & mix FX. autosave improvements. Usability improvements & bug fixes.
2021	14 October	5.4.1	Bug fixes.
2022	11 January	5.5.0	Automation, gain envelopes, and listening bus for mastering projects. Target peak and loudness settings. Chord extraction from MIDI data. Bulk export for digital formats. MIDI strum patterns.
2022	22 February	5.5.1	Usability improvements & bug fixes.
2022	5 April	5.5.2	Usability improvements & bug fixes.
2022	Version 6		
2022	29 September	6.0.0	"Smart" templates, UI customization, video track, lyrics track, cloud-based collaboration (via PreSonus Sphere), new plugins including de-esser and vocoder.
2022	9 November	6.0.1	Usability improvements & bug fixes.
2022	13 December	6.0.2	Bug fixes.
2023	22 March	6.1.0	Mastering project templates. Usability improvements & bug fixes.
2023	30 March	6.1.1	Bug fixes.
2023	25 May	6.1.2	Bug fixes.
2023	18 July	6.2.0	Rebranding of PreSonus Sphere as Studio One+. Usability improvements & bug fixes.
2023	1 August	6.2.1	Bug fixes.
2023	26 September	6.5.0	Spatial audio mixing and Dolby Atmos support. Import & export support for DAWproject files. Linux support.
2023	1 November	6.5.1	Bug fixes.
2024	16 January	6.5.2	Bug fixes.
2024	2 April	6.6.0	Support for Apple Spatial Audio, direct integration with TuneCore, new synth instrument Lead Architect.
2024	8 May	6.6.1	Usability improvements & bug fixes.
2024	9 July	6.6.2	Usability improvements & bug fixes.
2024	24 September	6.6.3	Connectivity fix for SoundCloud integration.
2024	Version 7		
2024	9 October	7.0.0	Global transposition, stem extraction, event looping, loop Launcher, enhanced tempo detection, Splice integration, CLAP plugin support.
2024	20 November	7.0.1	Usability improvements & bug fixes.
2024	4 December	7.0.2	Bug fixes.
2025	29 January	7.1.0	New 'Cinematic Lights' instrument, bus 'freeze' functionality, usability improvements, and bug fixes.
2025	12 February	7.1.1	Bug fixes.
2025	3 June	7.2.0	New 'Sub Zero' instrument, Nashville Number System support, usability improvements.
2025	24 June	7.2.1	Bug fixes.
2025	29 July	7.2.2	Bug fixes.
2025	29 October	7.2.3	Bug fixes.
2026	Version 8 (as Fender Studio Pro)		
2026	13 January	8.0.0	New name and branding, audio-to-MIDI transformation tools, chord assistant, uplifted user interface, new Fender-branded plug-ins.
2026	27 January	8.0.1	Bug fixes.
2026	3 March	8.0.2	Bug fixes.

== See also ==
- Comparison of digital audio editors
- List of music software
