= Central Music Company =

Chinese audio equipment manufacturer

CME (Central Music Company)
- Type: Private
- Industry: Specialty Manufacturing and Distribution: Musical Instruments
- Founded: 1993
- Headquarters: Beijing, China
- Products: Musical instruments, Recording equipment and accessories
- Website: www.cme-pro.com

CME is the registered trademark of Central Music Company, a musical high-tech company founded in Beijing, China in 1993. Its main focus is consumer and professional digital music production equipment.

== History ==
Central Music Company imports and distributes into the Chinese music production market many of the world's most well known music production brands including Apogee, E-Mu, Event, Kurzweil, Moog, MOTU, Novation, PreSonus, RME, and Røde (among others). CME was also the distributor for Yamaha music production products in China, until April 1, 2005 when Yamaha founded its own Chinese subsidiary. After this, CME began researching both the Chinese and overseas markets and started developing its own products. These products are now sold worldwide under the CME brand name.

== Products ==
CME is known primarily for its MIDI keyboard controllers. Their UF series MIDI keyboards were particularly ubiquitous in professional music creation circles in the early-to-mid 2000s, seen in demo videos of virtual instruments such as Propellerheads Reason and Arturia. The hammer-action of the keys on the 88-key UF8 keyboard were particularly popular. CME has branched out from only making MIDI keyboard controllers and also has made:

- ASX - an expansion card for the UF series and VX series keyboard controllers that made them stand-alone synthesizers
- Bitstream 3X - a Wave Idea MIDI desktop control surface
- Matrix K - a USB audio interface with optional FireWire expansion
- Matrix X - an analog 5 channel mixer
- Matrix Z - a 4-channel analog headphone amplifier
- U-Key - a portable synthesizer
- UF series UF5, UF6, UF7, UF8 - MIDI keyboard controllers
- VX series VX5, VX6, VX7, VX8 - MIDI keyboard controllers with motorized faders, touch-sensitive pads, and HUI control surface capabilities
- WIDI-XU - a wireless MIDI transmitter the size of a small USB flash drive.
- WIDI-X8 - a wireless MIDI system
- ZSC series ZSC64, ZSC 76, ZSC88 - MIDI keyboard controllers with weighted keys on all smaller-size models
