= PreSonus =

American audio equipment and software company

PreSonus Audio Electronics, Inc.
- Type: Subsidiary
- Industry: Music Technology; Music Software; Music Equipment; Professional Audio
- Founded: 1995; 31 years ago
- Founders: Jim Odom; Brian Smith
- Headquarters: Baton Rouge, Louisiana, U.S.
- Area served: Worldwide
- Products: Studio Pro; Notion; Progression; Recording Interfaces; Digital Mixers; Control Surfaces; Loudspeakers
- Brands: Studio One; StudioLive; FaderPort; AudioBox; Eris; Ceres; Sceptre; WorxAudio; Quantum; Studio; FireStudio; Notion; Nimbit
- Parent: Fender
- Website: www.presonus.com

PreSonus Audio Electronics, Inc. (often known and styled as PreSonus) was an American manufacturer of professional audio equipment and software, used to create, record, mix, and master music and other audio. This includes their line of digital audio workstation (DAW) software, Studio One (now known as Studio Pro). Since November 2021, the company is a subsidiary of Fender.

== History ==
PreSonus was founded in 1995, in Baton Rouge, Louisiana by Louisiana State University electrical engineering graduates Jim Odom (also a member of the rock band LeRoux) and Brian Smith, to solve technical issues with engineering music CDs. It was initially based out of Odom's garage.

The company's first product was the DCP-8, a multi-channel digital processor (including compression, gating and mix automation) that could control analog audio using MIDI (resulting in a new patent). Subsequent products include the DigiMax multi-channel microphone preamplifier with ADAT output (2000), the Central Station monitor controller with talkback (2004), and multi-channel FireWire interfaces, including the FireStation (2002), FirePod (2004), and FireStudio series (2006).

In 2006, KristalLabs Software Ltd., a start-up in Hamburg founded by former Steinberg developers Wolfgang Kundrus and Matthias Juwan, began working on the Studio One DAW and on the Capture live-recording software in cooperation with PreSonus. KristalLabs subsequently became part of PreSonus when the company acquired all of their assets in 2009 (leading to the creation of the new entity PreSonus Software Limited).

In 2008, PreSonus developed the AudioBox USB audio/MIDI interface, and in 2009, the company launched its StudioLive series of digital mixers, the first version of their Studio One DAW, and the first version of their Capture live-recording software. This was followed by their Virtual StudioLive (VSL) control software in 2010, and their QMix control app in 2012.

In 2011 PreSonus jointly developed the Audio Random Access (ARA) plug-in extension with Celemony, to allow greater integration between audio plug-ins and DAW software.

PreSonus expanded in 2012 by acquiring the Nimbit online direct-to-fan music service, again in 2013 when they acquired assets from Notion Music (including the Notion and Progression music-notation and composition software applications), and again in 2014 by acquiring the live sound hardware manufacturer WorxAudio (PreSonus continue to sell specific hardware, including loudspeakers, under this brand).

Wolfgang Kundrus and Eike Jonas left PreSonus in 2014. Kundrus is now Software Architect and Senior Developer for EastWest Sounds.

In November, 2018, PreSonus released their 16-pad ATOM portable MIDI Controller, which included extended integration features with their Studio One software.

In November, 2021, Fender announced it they had signed a definitive agreement of merger with PreSonus.

== Core products ==
=== Hardware ===
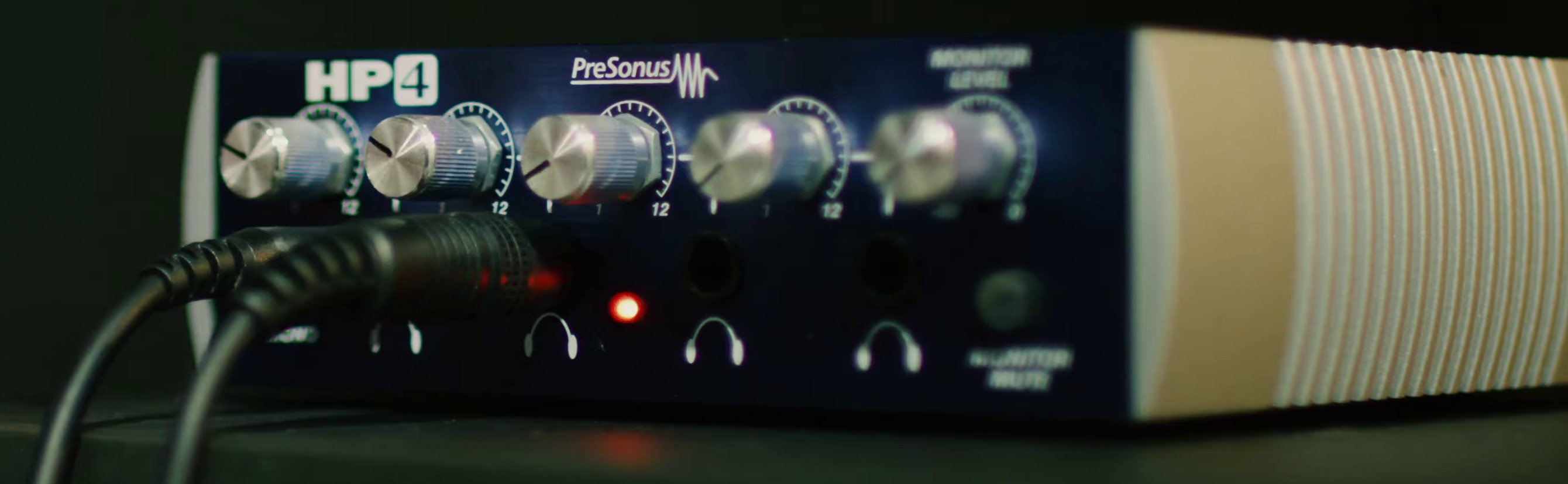
HP4 4-Channel Headphone Amplifier

Hardware manufactured by PreSonus includes the following:

- Digital mixers, allowing multiple audio channels to be fed into a computer system via a single USB or Firewire connection, including the StudioLive brand.
- Control surfaces, including the StudioLive and FaderPort brands.
- MIDI controllers, such as the ATOM brand.
- USB, Thunderbolt and Firewire audio and MIDI recording interfaces, including the AudioBox, Studio, Quantum, and (now discontinued) FireStudio brands.
- Studio monitors, including the Eris, Ceres and Sceptre brands.
- Loudspeakers, including the WorxAudio brand.
- Headphone amplifiers.

=== Software ===
PreSonus produce multiple software products related to music and other audio, including:

- Studio Pro (formerly known as Studio One): A digital audio workstation (DAW).
- Notion: Music composition and performance software.
- Capture: Live-recording software, designed for PreSonus' StudioLive brand digital mixers.

== See also ==
- List of studio monitor manufacturers
