= Casio DG-20 =

Digital guitar and guitar synthesizer by Casio

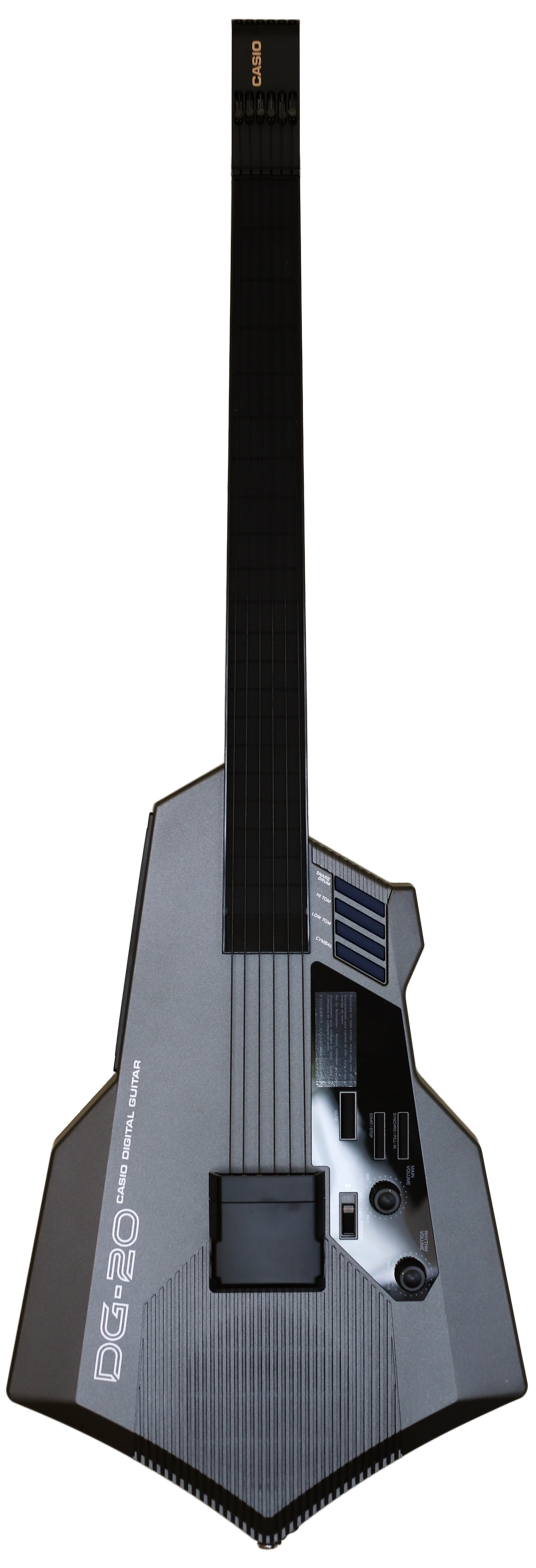
Casio DG-20 digital guitar with original factory sticker stating that only nylon strings may be used

The Casio DG-20 was a guitar synthesizer and MIDI controller manufactured by Casio. It was a relatively low-cost MIDI instrument that gave guitarists access to electronic sounds from a fretboard-based controller. The instrument combined built-in preset tones, PCM rhythm patterns, an onboard speaker and MIDI output with a guitar-like playing action, although contemporary reviewers noted that it did not behave like a conventional guitar.

== Design and features ==
The DG-20 uses six equal-gauge nylon strings and a rubberized fretboard membrane with switches behind each fret. String movement acts as the trigger for note generation, while pitch is determined by the selected fret position rather than by string tension. Contemporary reviews said that this design eliminated the tracking delay associated with many early guitar-based MIDI systems, but also made note bending impossible. Reviewers nevertheless found that techniques such as hammer-ons, pull-offs and glides could be used, albeit with compromises in feel and accuracy.

The DG-20 provides 20 preset tones, including acoustic and electric guitar variations as well as non-guitar sounds such as glocken, harp, shamisen, jazz organ, trumpet, mandolin, flute and clarinet. The instrument also includes 12 PCM-based rhythm patterns and four onboard drum pads plus controls for transposing.

The instrument includes a 2-watt speaker, line and headphone outputs, a footswitch jack for rhythm control and a 9 V power input. It can operate from six D-size batteries or an optional AC adaptor.

== Reception and legacy ==
In Making Music, Jerry Uwins wrote that the DG-20 offered a "commendably professional" way to access keyboard and MIDI sounds from a fretboard. He praised its "instantaneous triggering" and value, but said that it could not function as a "real guitar" and noted the unfamiliar feel of its nylon strings and membrane controls.

A 1988 review in ETI Guide to Making Music described the DG-20 as Casio's cheapest MIDI guitar offering. The reviewer praised its expressiveness and versatility, but criticized its plastic construction, lack of touch sensitivity and the compromises it required in playing technique, concluding that it was "an exceptionally clever instrument" for the price.

The instrument received renewed online attention in 2022 when Japanese guitar virtuoso Ichika Nito demonstrated a DG-20 in video performances.

== Specifications ==
Specification	Details
Polyphony	6-note polyphony; monophonic in solo mode
Preset tones	20 tones: acoustic guitar 1–4, electric guitar 1–2, flanger, glocken, harp, shamisen, jazz organ, trumpet, chorus, distortion, crystal, funky clavi, mandolin, organ, flute and clarinet
Rhythms	12 PCM-based auto-rhythm patterns: rock, 16 beat, pops, reggae, country, enka, swing, blues, bossa nova, slow rock, waltz and tango
Drum pads	4 onboard pads: snare drum, high tom, low tom and cymbal
Effects and performance controls	Tune, transpose, mute and solo selectors
MIDI	MIDI Out; mode I (poly) and mode II (mono); note on/off, start/stop, timing clock, program change and portamento transmission
Audio and control connections	Headphone jack, line output, footswitch jack, AC adaptor input
Speaker	12 cm speaker, rated at 2.0 W
Power	Six D-size batteries; optional AD-5 AC adaptor; optional CA-5 car adaptor; automatic power-off after approximately 6 minutes
Dimensions	995 × 340 × 95 mm
Weight	3.5 kg including batteries
Contemporary UK price	£279 in Making Music (September 1987); £249 in ETI Guide to Making Music (1988)
