= Control surface =

Control surface may refer to:

- Audio control surface, a human interface device (HID) which allows the user to control a digital audio
- Flight control surfaces, allow a pilot to adjust and control the aircraft's flight attitude
- Diving plane, a control surface in submarines
- Control surface (fluid dynamics), a surface‍—‌enclosing a control volume‍—‌through which a fluid flow occurs
