= Notion (music software) =

Scorewriter

- Original author: Notion Music
- Developer: PreSonus
- Initial release: 2005
- Stable release: 6.8.2 / August 24, 2021; 4 years ago
- Operating system: Windows, macOS, iOS, Android, Fire OS
- Type: Scorewriter
- License: Commercial Proprietary Software
- Website: www.presonus.com/products/notation-software

Notion, previously stylized as NOTION, is a computer software program for music composition and performance, created by NOTION Music (formerly Virtuosoworks) of Greensboro, North Carolina. NOTION Music was acquired by PreSonus in 2013 which in turn was acquired by Fender Musical Instruments in 2021. Notion 6 is available on Microsoft Windows and macOS, and Notion Mobile is available for Windows, macOS, iOS, Android and Fire OS.

== Composition ==
Notion supports composition using a computer keyboard/mouse, MIDI keyboard, MIDI guitar, MIDI file, MusicXML file, or handwriting recognition. It automatically handles aspects of music notation such as stem direction and alignment of rhythmic values, and supports the input and output of notation in tablature form, synchronized with the standard music notation.

It includes an audio mixer to set volume levels, perform panning, and add effects such as equalization, compression and reverb.

From version 3 onward, it supports third-party VST effects and other third-party sound libraries, including presets for products from the Vienna Symphonic Library, EastWest, Miroslav Philharmonik, and Garritan Personal Orchestra.

== Playback and performance ==
Notion's sample playback library was recorded at Abbey Road by the London Symphony Orchestra. The playback engine has options for real-time interpretation of tempi, articulations, and performance techniques.

Users can capture playback in wav digital audio files for transfer to CD or digital audio workstation, or for conversion to other audio formats such as mp3.

== Integration with Studio One ==
Starting with version 3.3 in 2016, the Studio One DAW (also developed by PreSonus) is integrated with Notion version 6 and above, allowing the two applications to perform real-time audio and MIDI streaming (via either ReWire or PreSonus' own UCNET protocol) to share audio, note, track, VST and score data, either with both applications running on the same computer, or on multiple computers connected to a network.

This integration was expanded further by Notion version 6.4 (May 2018, following the release of the Chord track for Studio One in version 4), allowing the transfer of chord-level information between the two applications; and version 6.5 (January 2019), which enabled the automatic translation of drum tracks into standard percussion notation.

In 2021 Notion Mobile was released based on Studio One's software framework, enabling the two applications to share and natively open Notion document files.

== See also ==
- PreSonus
- Studio One (software)
- List of music software
