= Human User Interface Protocol =

Android and Wi-Fi communication

Human User Interface Protocol (commonly abbreviated to HUI) is a proprietary MIDI communications protocol for interfacing between a hardware audio control surface and digital audio workstation (DAW) software. It was first created by Mackie and Digidesign in 1997 for use with Pro Tools, and is now part of the Mackie Control Universal (MCU) protocol.

== Functionality ==
HUI protocol allows a digital audio workstation (DAW) and a connected hardware control surface to exchange MIDI signals that synchronize the states of their sliders, buttons, wheels, and displays. The user can write console automation which can then be seen in the DAW. It includes support for 10-bit/1,024 discrete values.

== History ==
The HUI protocol was created jointly by Mackie and Digidesign in 1997 for Mackie's Human User Interface (HUI), the first non-Digidesign hardware control surface for Digidesign’s Pro Tools. It was subsequently implemented by hardware controllers from manufacturers such as Solid State Logic, Yamaha, TASCAM, and Novation.

By the time Mackie introduced the Baby HUI in August 2002, the protocol was also supported by DAWs including Digital Performer and Nuendo, making them cross-compatible with HUI-compatible hardware controllers. Other DAWs to support HUI protocol include Logic Pro, REAPER, and Cakewalk Sonar.

=== Mackie Control Universal (MCU) ===
In 2003, the Mackie Control Universal (MCU) protocol was introduced, combining together functionality from Mackie Control, Logic Control and HUI into a single protocol. DAWs which support MCU (in addition to those which support HUI) include Ardour, Ableton Live, Studio One, Cubase, and Reason. ACID Pro 9 and ACID Pro Next from MAGIX also support MCU. An Arduino library has also implemented a large portion of MCU, enabling control surfaces to be built with Arduino-compatible microcontrollers.
