= Neopol =

- Origin: Istanbul, Turkey
- Genres: Electro house, progressive house, EDM
- Occupation(s): DJs, producers
- Instrument(s): Master keyboard, synthesizer, Studio One
- Years active: 2010–present
- Labels: Subluminate Records, Angry Records, Big Finale Records, Enough Records, Simya Müzik, Arpej Yapım
- Members: Ozan Ülke; Nilüfer Ülke
- Website: iloveneopol.com

Neopol is a Turkish house music duo founded by Ozan Ülke and Nilüfer Ülke in 2010. Neopol, won the remix contest by American indie pop band Super Mirage hold for their track Dance Hall within the same year. Canadian band The Easton Ellises came up with their new single Dance It, Dance All in 2012, in which they also included the tracks' Neopol remix. The single Koza, released by the duo in November 2012, also happens to be the first Turkish electro/progressive house track. The second single Sanki Sen published in February 2013, also included a remix by accomplished musician Salih Korkut Peker of Istanbul Arabesque Project. After publishing its second track Sanki Sen, the duo is also pleasing its fans abroad with the succeeding English singles I Love It Big and It's Voodoo. Neopol has won recognition for its unique dj+vocal performances.

== Singles ==
2012

- "Koza"

2013

- "Sanki Sen"
- "I Love It Big"

2014

- "It's Voodoo"

2015

- "Asortik"
- "Zero Hundred"

== Remixes ==
2010

- "Super Mirage – Dance Hall (Neopol Remix)"

2012

- "The Easton Ellises – Dance It, Dance All (Neopol Remix)"

2013

- "Lazy Rich & Hirshee feat Amba Shepherd – Damage Control (Neopol Bootleg Remix)"
- "How To Destroy Angels – Strings & Attractors (Neopol Bootleg Remix)
- "Fedde Le Grand – Rockin' N' Rollin' (Neopol Bootleg Remix)
- "Dev – Dans Et (Neopol Remix)"
- "Linkin Park & Steve Aoki – A Light That Never Comes (Neopol Bootleg Remix)

2015

- "Azealia Banks – Chasing Time (Neopol Bootleg Remix)"
- "R3hab & Nervo & Ummet Ozcan - Revolution (Neopol Remix)"
