= Splice (platform) =

Cloud-based music platform

- Company type: Private
- Available in: English
- Headquarters: New York City, New York, U.S.
- Area served: Worldwide
- Founders: Matt Aimonetti; Steve Martocci
- Industry: Music Creation Software
- Website: splice.com
- Registration: Optional (required for creating and downloading projects)
- Launched: 9 October 2013; 12 years ago
- Current status: Active
- Written in: Go, Objective-C, C#, JavaScript

Splice is a cloud-based music creation platform founded by Matt Aimonetti and Steve Martocci which includes a sample library, audio plug-ins on a subscription basis, and integration with several digital audio workstations (DAWs). The program is available for MacOS, Windows, iOS and Android.

== History ==
The site and the MacOS version of Studio Splice was launched in private beta in October 2013. A Windows version was released a few months later and the offer became available to the public in September 2014. Splice Studio allows musicians to remotely collaborate through the cloud. The technology is compatible with several popular digital audio workstations (DAWs) programs including Ableton Live, Logic Pro X, FL Studio, Garageband, and Studio One.

Its subscription-based sample marketplace, Splice Sounds, was launched in 2015.

In 2016, Splice introduced Rent-To-Own, which allowed users to pay a monthly fee to access premium products like synths. The model enabled users to put their rental balance toward the ownership cost and own the product outright or move on to a new program without paying the full market price. The Rent-To-Own program expanded in 2017 to products like Ozone 8 and Neutron 2, prompting The Verge to proclaim: "Splice is making it much easier to buy expensive music production plugins".

In 2019, Splice launched its proprietary AI-driven feature Similar Sounds, giving users machine-learning based similarity search across the entire marketplace of audio samples. In November, the company introduced a mobile version of its app on iOS and Android.

In 2020 Splice launched the inaugural Splice Awards, recognizing artists in multiple categories, including "Splice Producer of the Year", "Splice Breakout Artist of the Year", "Splice New Standard", "Best Use of Splice Sounds" and "Best Sound Design". The Awards also recognized Splice's "Most Downloaded One Shot", "Most Downloaded Loop", and "Most Downloaded Pack & Vocal Pack".

In June 2021, Splice launched Skills and Connected Instruments with their new Creator Plans. In May 2022, Steve Martocci stepped down as CEO and transitioned to the company's executive chairman and chief strategy officer. Kakul Srivastava was named Splice's new CEO.

In March 2023 Splice announced it was closing its Studio collaboration platform.

In April 2025 Splice acquired British music technology company, Spitfire Audio.

== Funding ==
In October 2013, Splice raised $2.75 million in a seed funding round led by Union Square Ventures with participation from True Ventures, Lerer Ventures, SV Angel, First Round Capital, Code Advisors, Rob Wiesenthal, David Tisch and Seth Goldstein. Splice raised an additional $4.5 in funding from a Series A round led by True Ventures with participation from Scooter Braun, Tiësto, Steve Angello, AM Only, WME, Plus Eight Equity Fund LP and existing investors including Union Square Ventures in 2014. Splice raised $35 million in a Series B round of funding led by Draper Fisher Jurvetson in 2017. A$57.7 million Series C round followed in 2019, co-led by Union Square Ventures and True Ventures with participation from DFJ Growth, Flybridge, Lerer Hippeau, LionTree, Founders Circle Capital and Matt Pincus. In February 2021, Splice raised a $55 million series D round led by Goldman Sachs, with additional participation from the venture firm Music. The latest round brought the company's total funding to more than $150 million and estimated valuation to nearly $500 million.

== Commercial usage ==
In 2018, Zedd & Grey's single "The Middle" (feat. Maren Morris) featured sounds from Grey's Singular Sounds sample label. The song was nominated for three Grammy Awards and was certified 3× Platinum by the RIAA in 2019. Other notable Top 40 hits to feature Splice samples include Ariana Grande's “Break Up With Your Girlfriend, I’m Bored,” Lil Nas X's “Panini,” Dua Lipa's “Don’t Start Now,” Bad Bunny's “Dakiti” and Shane Codd's "Get Out My Head".

In February 2020, the song "Running Over" was released by Justin Bieber. His producers had used a sample from Splice created by UK producer Laxcity. Musician Asher Monroe accused Bieber of stealing the melody from his 2019 song "Synergy". However, the sound came from the same Laxcity sample pack used by Bieber. The Verge stated, "Justin Bieber was accused of stealing a melody, but it’s actually a royalty-free sample you can buy online."

On April 11, 2024, Sabrina Carpenter released the critically acclaimed song, "Espresso". The song features multiple loops from the Splice sample pack "Oliver: Power Tools Sample Pack III", created by Oliver.
