= KRISTAL Audio Engine =

Digital audio workstation for Microsoft Windows

- Original author: Matthias Juwan
- Developer: Kreatives
- Initial release: 31 January 2004; 21 years ago
- Final release: 1.0.1 / 1 June 2004; 21 years ago
- Operating system: Microsoft Windows
- Type: Digital audio workstation
- License: Proprietary Software
- Website: kreatives.org/kristal/

The KRISTAL Audio Engine (commonly referred to as KRISTAL or KAE) is a digital audio workstation for Microsoft Windows. It is free for personal & educational use, with licensing options for commercial use.

The successor to this product became what is now known as Studio One.

== History ==
=== Initial Development ===
The original Crystal Audio Engine interface.

KRISTAL began development in 1999, as the university thesis project of Matthias Juwan. At that time it had a different look and feel, and was known as the Crystal Audio Engine, a name derived from the song The Crystal Ship by The Doors.

Following a public beta period, the initial version, renamed to the KRISTAL Audio Engine, was released in 2004, under the developer name of Kreatives.

=== K2 and KristalLabs ===
On 24 December 2004 the KRISTAL development team announced that they were working on the successor to the KRISTAL Audio Engine, based on a new infrastructure. The development team planned for this successor to include cross-platform support for both Windows and macOS. The new software, known as K2, entered the Alpha development stage in July 2005.

The KristalLabs logo, later used as the basis for the Studio One logo.

On 18 September 2006, it was announced that all work and rights to the source code of K2 had been taken over by KristalLabs Software Ltd., a private start-up company co-founded by KRISTAL lead developer, Matthias Juwan, and Wolfgang Kundrus, who had previously worked on Cubase, Nuendo and HALion. Ownership for the original KRISTAL Audio Engine, however, did not transition to KristalLabs.

=== PreSonus Studio One / Fender Studio Pro ===
KristalLabs further developed K2 in cooperation with the American music technology company, PreSonus, before becoming part of PreSonus in 2009. Following this acquisition, the final result of the K2 development was re-branded and released as the first version of the PreSonus DAW, Studio One, for macOS and Windows. The former KristalLabs logo (representing a series of hexagons, like the one from the original KRISTAL Audio Engine logo, tessellated together) was used as the basis for the logo of Studio One.

All versions of Studio One were subsequently developed and released by PreSonus until its acquisition and rebranding by Fender as Studio Pro, effective from January 2026.

== Functionality ==
KRISTAL is free for personal & educational use, with licensing options for commercial use.

The primary window of the application is a digital mixer, but it provides separate, built-in components for additional functionality, such as audio sequencing and live audio input/recording. It includes built-in effects, such as EQ, chorus, delay and reverb, but also supports the use of third-party VST plug-ins. It can support up to 16 channels of audio; however, it does not provide support for MIDI.

The application uses 32-bit audio processing and supports both MME & ASIO drivers. In addition to its native Kristal project files, it is also compatible with WAVE, AIFF, FLAC and OGG Vorbis files.

== See also ==
- Comparison of digital audio editors
