= Direct-to-fan =

Business model for the music industry

Direct-to-fan is a business model used by independent musicians, independent music labels, music marketing professionals, promoters, and others in the music industry. Direct-to-fan is also becoming a model used by the broad definition of artists, including comedians, visual artists, and other entertainers looking to build and leverage a fan community throughout their career.

The direct-to-fan model bypasses the major record label model that historically controlled radio, venue, and distribution channels, and lets the artist (or the team that supports that musician) create interest in their music directly with their fans, identify those fans, market directly to and develop relationships with those fans, sell directly to and monetize those relationships, and use those relationships to expand their fan base.

Foundation components of this model include music discovery sites, and direct-to-fan music sales, marketing, and business solutions.

Direct-to-fan models encourage engaging directly between the artist and their fans, keeping the fans engaged, knowing who they are (who, what, when, where, why), building the artist's brand, and developing the artist-to-fan relationship over time.

== Background ==
An early example of this method in the music industry was by the British rock band Marillion, who used the internet to connect with their fans to finance a North American tour in 1997 and a subsequent album in 2001, instead of signing to a record label. In 2008, Alexis Petridis described the band in The Guardian as "the undisputed pioneers" of this practice. It was also addressed by Michael Lewis in his book Next: The Future Just Happened.

== Tools ==
Some tools supporting direct-to-fan include: storefronts to sell direct-to-fan on band websites and on social networking sites such as Facebook or MySpace, Widget tools to embed sales, gig or event calendar, profile info anywhere including blogs, Marketing tools such as email marketing and messaging, Event tools, Central Content Management tools, Central Catalog Management tools for both digital and physical products, and digital delivery platforms that make it easy for you to sell direct from your website or social media by integrating with payment gateways, providing a checkout and automatically delivering music to fans via a download link.

== Solution example ==
An example of a direct-to-fan solution would have online storefronts for their official band websites, Facebook, MySpace, blogs, etc.; Marketing solutions for email marketing, fan capture, fan messaging, and fan management; Label services including digital distribution to iTunes, Amazon, and other retail sites, CD and DVD manufacturing, custom merch, print services, graphic design and web services, warehousing and fulfilment, backend ecommerce and payment processing, and more.

Core applications that assist musicians in implementing a direct-to-fan approach include:

- Fan community platforms
- Band website and storefronts
- digital delivery companies
- CD/DVD manufacturing
- Digital music distribution
- Download cards
- E-tickets and mobile-tickets
- Fan email marketing and messaging
- Fan marketing solutions
- Merchandise
- Music discovery
- Music festival submissions
- Payment processing
- Physical warehousing and fulfillment
- Poster and print services
- Storefronts
- Pre-sale ticket and album options
- Integration of social sites, such as Facebook and Twitter
- Fan-funding capabilities

Companies that are delivering portions of the above direct-to-fan solution include:

Bandcamp, Bandsintown, Shopify, Cafe Press, CD Baby, Constant Contact, Music Glue, Nimbit, NoiseTrade, Pledgemusic, ReverbNation, TuneCore, Zazzle, GigRev.

== See also ==
- Crowdfunding
- Fan-funded music
