= Music Glue =

E-commerce platform for music industry

- Company type: Ltd.
- Industry: Music; E-commerce; Technology
- Founded: London, United Kingdom (March 19, 2007)
- Founder: Mark Meharry
- Headquarters: London, United Kingdom
- Area served: Worldwide
- Key people: Mark Meharry (CEO)
- Services: Direct-to-fan; E-commerce; Tickets
- Website: musicglue.com

Music Glue is a specialist e-commerce platform for the music business which allows artists to sell physical and digital music, merchandise, and event tickets in multiple currencies and languages direct-to-fan. The company is headquartered in London, with offices in New York and Sydney.

== History ==
Music Glue was launched in 2007 by Mark Meharry, with the goal of allowing artists to sell their music directly to consumers. "Controlled filesharing" was introduced with the band Marillion.

In 2013, Music Glue launched its direct-to-fan platform at the Great Escape Festival in Brighton, United Kingdom. By this time, Music Glue had worked with artists including Mumford and Sons, Gabrielle Aplin, Nina Nesbitt, Enter Shikari, Ben Howard, Ghostpoet.

In July 2014, Music Glue became the primary ticket vendor for Gentlemen of the Road, a two-day festival in Lewes, Sussex.

In September 2014, UK promotion group MAMA & Company announced a partnership with Music Glue for all applications for The Great Escape 2015, whereby artists applying to play the Brighton-based festival would need to create a Music Glue profile in order for their application to be accepted.

Music Glue now runs the apply to play service for The Great Escape, Bushstock, Mondo NYC, Live at Leeds, Kendall Calling, Focus Wales, Evolution Emerging, Norwich Sound & Vision, Metropolis Rising.

In 2015, Public Service Broadcasting used Music Glue for pre-orders and direct-to-fan sales for their album The Race For Space which charted at number 11 in the UK Albums chart and number 1 in the UK Independent Albums chart, and for tickets for The Race For Space tour. That year, Music Glue also was the ticketing vendor for Mumford & Sons UK Arena Tour with up to 50% of tickets per show sold via the platform.

In 2017, Music Glue celebrated their 10th birthday and announced a partnership with Probity, an independently owned music merchandising company offering worldwide tour, retail and licensing services.

Music Glue has been chosen by British Rock band Enter Shikari to be their official tickets partner on their UK and EU arena tour, selling direct to fans.

In 2026, Music Glue launched The Artist Marketplace, a global eCommerce solution that allows artists to consolidate multiple regional stores into a single shopfront, simplifying purchasing for fans and operations for artists. The platform integrates with major eCommerce systems such as Shopify, Magento, WooCommerce, and Salesforce.

== Recognition ==
In October 2007, Music Glue was nominated for a Best Innovation award at the BT Digital Music Awards. Music Glue had been called one of the "Top 100 tech media companies" by The Guardian.

Music Glue’s Ticket Access Pass was nominated for Music Consumer Innovation at the Music Week Awards 2025 and for Product Innovation at the 2025 Ticketing Business Awards.
