= Korg PadKontrol =

MIDI controller

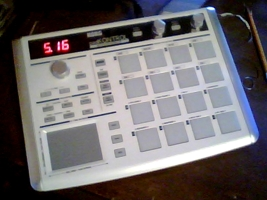
A Korg PadKontrol

The Korg PadKontrol was a USB MIDI controller manufactured by Korg. The PadKontrol was released in 2005 as a competitor to the Akai MPD and the M-Audio Triggerfinger. The PadKontrol has sixteen assignable, velocity sensitive pads, with sixteen "scenes" which allow the user to toggle between various pad configurations, and an assignable X-Y pad for drum rolls, flams, or controller input inside a VSTi or a MIDI sequencer.

== Use ==
The PadKontrol is commonly used for controlling virtual drum instruments in a MIDI sequencer (such as EZdrummer or BFD). Additionally, the PadKontrol can be used to control a software sampler Kontakt, for example) or can be used to control values within a MIDI sequencer.

=== Native Mode ===
When the PadKontrol is placed in native mode, the user has control over every button and light on the unit (including the LED display) and can use software on the computer to send MIDI data to the PadKontrol, giving programmers a means by which to write their own software for the PadKontrol.

== See also ==
- Korg
- MIDI controller
