= Logic Control =

Control surface

Logic Control is a control surface originally designed by Emagic in cooperation with Mackie.

== History ==
Logic Control was designed by Emagic as a dedicated control surface for their Logic digital audio workstation software. It was manufactured by Mackie, but distributed by Emagic.

About 6 months later, Mackie introduced a physically identical product called "Mackie Control" which included support for most major DAW applications, but not Logic. The Emagic Logic Control was still available and would only work with Logic.

Later, Mackie Control's firmware was revised to include compatibility with Logic, combining together Mackie Control, Logic Control and Human User Interface (HUI) into a single protocol. As a result, the name was changed to "Mackie Control Universal" (MCU). Out of the box, MCU included Lexan overlays with different button legends to support control of other DAWs such as Pro Tools and Cubase.

== Description ==
Logic Control (and now MCU) allows control of almost all Logic parameters with hardware faders, buttons and "V-Pots" (rotary knobs). Its touch-sensitive, motorized faders react to track automation. All transport functions and wheel scrubbing are also available. The unit also controls plug-in parameters. Visual feedback including current parameters being edited, parameter values, project location (SMPTE time code or bars/beats/divisions/ticks) are conveyed by a two-line LCD and red 7-segment LED displays.

== See also ==
- Logic Pro
- Mackie
