= Nimbit =

Former American sales and marketing company

Nimbit, Inc.
- Company type: Private
- Industry: Music; Independent music
- Founded: 2002; 24 years ago
- Founders: Phil Antoniades; Patrick Faucher; Joseph Twarog
- Headquarters: Framingham, Massachusetts
- Area served: Worldwide
- Services: Direct-to-Fan Sales; Direct-to-Fan Marketing; Digital Distribution; CD/DVD Manufacturing; E-Tickets
- Owner: PreSonus
- Website: nimbit.com

Nimbit, Inc. was an American company offering sales and marketing services for independent musicians, independent record labels and other organizations. It offered a web-based, direct-to-fan system, including a virtual storefront, which allows users to sell music and merchandise on Facebook and other websites, and tools for users to perform fundraising campaigns. Nimbit was acquired by ProSonus in 2018 and closed on December 9, 2020.

== History ==
=== Formation and early years ===
Nimbit was originally formed and incorporated by Phil Antoniades, Patrick Faucher, Matt Silbert, and Joseph Twarog in 2002, in Framingham, Massachusetts.

The company launched Nimbit WebTools in 2003, which was a content management system of website management tools and hosting services, designed for the entertainment industry. In 2004, they partnered with ASCAP to provide members with access to this package.

In 2007, Nimbit launched nimbitOMT ("Online Merch Table"), a system for selling MP3s, CDs, e-tickets and other merchandise across social networking websites, blogs and other websites. In 2008, this was followed by nimbitSkin, a customizable music storefront allowing the sale of products from any website. Also in 2008, the company introduced nimbitCards: physical cards which can be distributed to customers, who then use them for later redemption of items in the corresponding Nimbit store.

In September 2009, Nimbit released "MyStore" for Facebook, which integrated the previous promotion & sales features directly within a user's Facebook profile.

In April 2010 Nimbit announced that they were bringing on Bob Cramer as their CEO.

Nimbit's "Spotlight Store" for Facebook was released in March 2012, providing an expanded version of the original Nimbit "MyStore", optimized for Facebook's new timeline view.

=== PreSonus ownership ===
In July 2012 Nimbit announced it had been acquired by PreSonus, the manufacturer of music production software and hardware, for an undisclosed sum.

PreSonus expanded Nimbit functionality the following year by adding localisation options for language and currency in the virtual storefronts, and automatic customer follow-up from promotions.

In January 2014, several new features were added to the service, including custom fan lists, a new event check-in service, a new email marketing tool, and additions to the event management tool. Shortly afterwards, in June 2014, PreSonus announced a redesigned version of Nimbit, with new functionality. Further expansions made in 2014 included a re-designed store page, plugins for embedding Nimbit features into external websites, support for HD audio, and a re-designed product management page.

Nimbit was shut down on December 9, 2020.

== Services ==
=== User profiles ===
Nimbit users are provided with an online interface to create a profile for themselves, including any promotional photos or videos, and a calendar of their public events. In addition, the profile provides access to the corresponding store for their music and merchandise.

=== Sales and tips ===
Nimbit provides virtual storefronts, which users can leverage for selling directly to fans. These storefronts can be embedded onto external websites. In addition, Nimbit provides means for including connections to these storefronts within other social networking websites, such as Facebook, Jango, PledgeMusic, and Fanbridge.

Users can sell both digital and physical products from these virtual storefronts, and customers can also provide additional money to them in the form of "tip jar" contributions.

Since June 2013, storefronts can be displayed in English, French, German, or Spanish, and allow users to sell in their local currency. Nimbit storefronts utilize PayPal, allowing them to accept purchases via PayPal or credit card, in any of PayPal's supported currencies.

Nimbit users have the option to define split payments, whereby an existing PayPal account can be set to automatically receive a custom percentage of profits from the storefront.

Users also have the ability to create UPCs for the products on sale and submit the resulting sales to Nielsen SoundScan for tracking.

=== Marketing and promotion ===
Nimbit's "Promotion Tool" provides the means for users to share details of specific promotions via Facebook, Twitter, Email, and embedded components on other websites. The tool includes options for embedded video, embedded audio and links to free or discounted content on the user's virtual storefront.

In September 2012, the tool's functionality was expanded to include an automatic follow-up, which would encourage customers who accessed the original promotion to make another purchase.

=== Fundraising ===
Nimbit also includes the functionality for users to conduct a fundraising campaign via the following options:

- A presale item in the virtual storefront
- Optional customer contributions for a free item in the virtual storefront
- Physical merchandise items in the virtual storefront, each associated to different levels of campaign contribution

=== FanCheck.in ===
Introduced in 2014, FanCheck.in is an online service which allows fans to 'check-in' to a specific event which a user is hosting, using a personalized URL. The service can be configured to automatically send follow-up emails to those who check-in, including links to free or discounted items from the user's Nimbit store. These check-ins also gather data for users about their customers, which they can access in their fan management features.

=== Fan management ===
Users can access a detailed list of fans for tracking and data mining purposes, including their contact information, spending habits, and event check-ins via the FanCheck.in service. Options are provided for filtering and grouping fans, and saving custom searches for later re-use.

=== Physical products ===
Nimbit provides services for CD and DVD replication, and for short-run CD-R and DVD-R duplication. The service includes packaging (including options for jewel cases, digipacks, and other packaging types), artwork (including inserts of various page counts), UPC generation (or use of an existing UPC, if available), electronic PDF graphic proof, assembly, and wrapping.

The same service channel also provides printing options for posters and other promotional materials.

=== E-tickets ===
In addition to music and merchandise, users can also sell e-tickets to events from the Nimbit virtual storefront. Tickets can be added to the storefront once the corresponding event has been added to the user's event calendar.

== Account options ==
Nimbit offers two account options: a free Nimbit account (formerly known as NimbitFree) and Nimbit Premium (formerly known as NimbitPlus). Nimbit Premium is a subscription plan which offers extended capabilities compared to the free account model, such as the following:

- Email marketing functionality
- HD audio options
- Reduced sales commission fee
- The ability to sell physical CDs and merchandise
- Additional store customization options
- FanCheck.in services
- The ability to manage multiple artists from a single account
- The ability to set automatic royalty splits
- Creation of UPCs for products
- Submission of sales tracking data to Nielsen Soundscan

Many of the additional features from Nimbit Premium can also be added onto a regular Nimbit account via separate monthly costs.

== Partnerships ==
ASCAP and Nimbit have partnered since 2004 to offer "ASCAP Web Tools" for ASCAP members.

PledgeMusic and Nimbit partnered in October 2011 to create "PledgeStore", so that users can have a Nimbit virtual store appear on their PledgeMusic page once their pledge goal has been met, providing ways for customers to continue contributing to the campaign and access additional content. This included functionality for users to sign up for the service directly from their PledgeMusic dashboard.

Jango and Nimbit partnered in June 2012 to offer the "Nimbit Store for Jango", allowing users to have a Nimbit store page visible on their Jango profile, and providing the functionality for them to sign up for the service from directly within Jango.
