= MIDI controller =

Input device that produces MIDI data

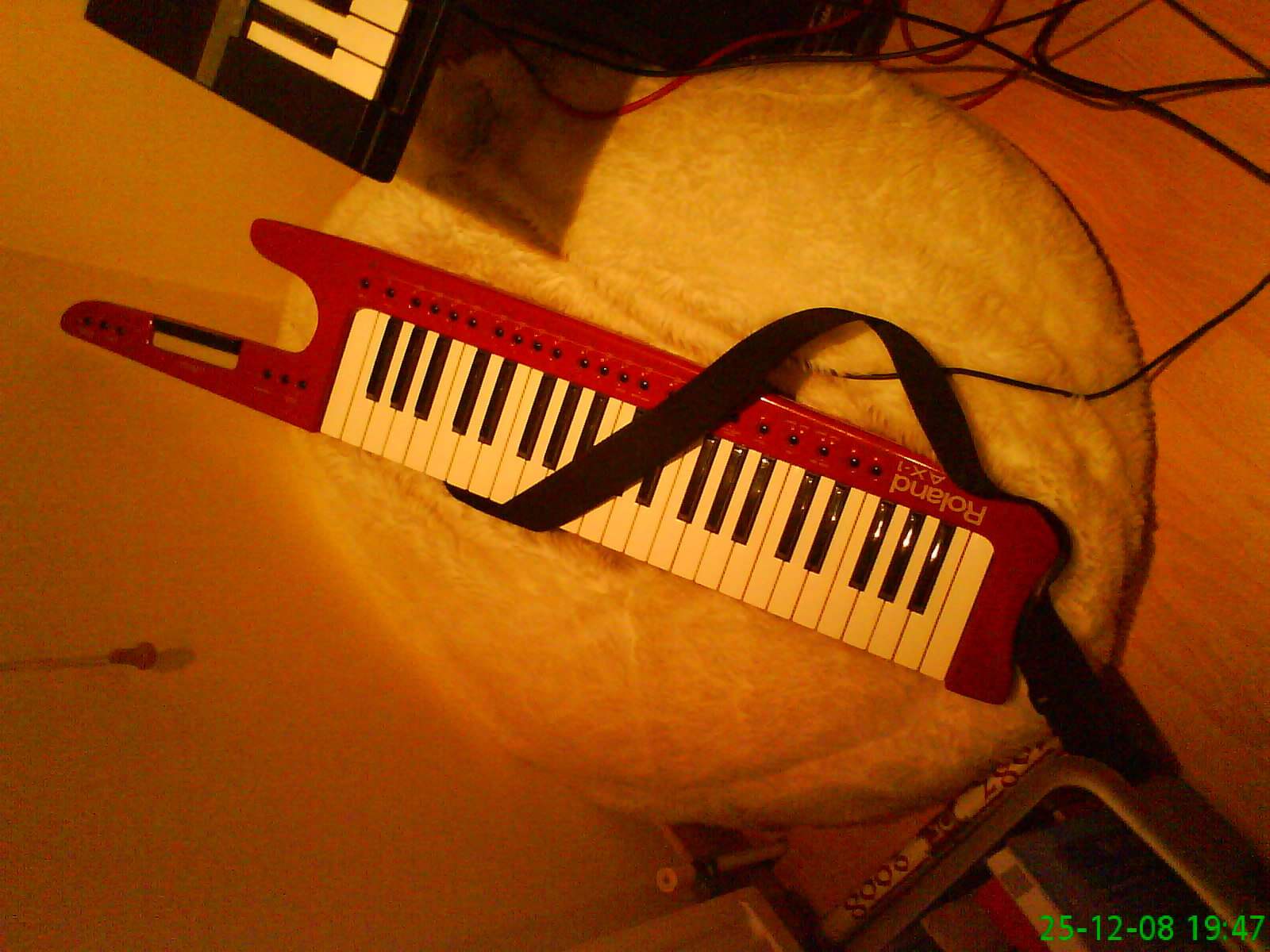
This keytar does not produce sound by itself, but sends data about which keys or buttons are pressed to another device which produces sound.

A MIDI controller is an input device and electronic musical instrument which typically converts physical interaction to Musical Instrument Digital Interface (MIDI) information. This information can be sent to a sound module, synthesizer, or sampler, or can be recorded using a music sequencer or digital audio workstation for later playback. A MIDI controller may or may not have a synthesizer or speaker built in, and most rely on external equipment to convert MIDI events into an audio signal and then into audible sound.

Often, MIDI controllers resemble traditional musical instruments. The most common type is the MIDI keyboard, which resembles a keyboard instrument like a piano, but parallels for a range of instruments exist, including wind controllers which resemble wind instruments, guitar-like controllers such as the SynthAxe, and electronic drum kits which mimic acoustic drums. There are also some controllers without acoustic parallels, the most common being MIDI-enabled music sequencers and simple drum pad controllers like the Roland Octapad, Korg PadKontrol and Novation Launchpad.

The most basic controllers transmit only data about the pitch and duration of notes, while more sophisticated devices are capable of sending further parameters, such as velocity and pitch bend. MIDI controllers can be cheaper, more portable and more versatile than full hardware synthesizers, although different types vary greatly in cost, and sending MIDI commands to a digital sampler normally produces a less authentic sound than that of a traditional instrument. MIDI controllers are an example of digital music technology, and are often used by producers of electronic music to play software synthesizers (or hardware synthesizers that lack their own keyboards).

== Types ==
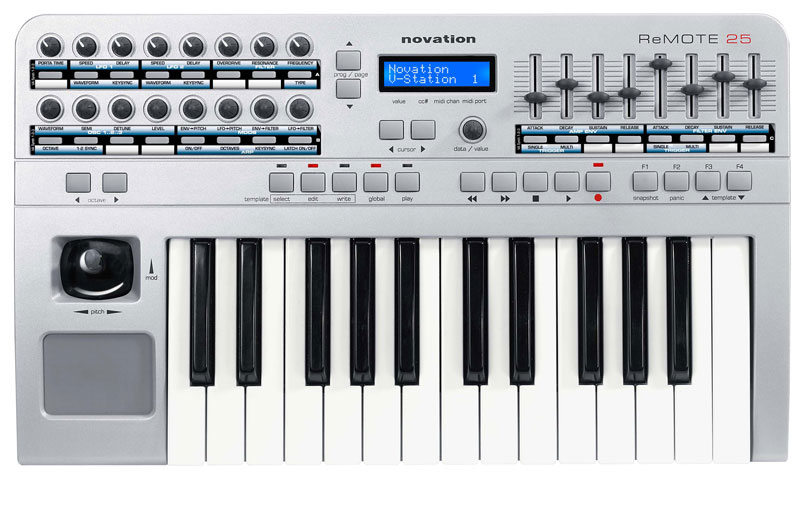
The Novation ReMOTE 25 provides a variety of controls, including ADSR envelope sliders and media playback controls, which can manipulate the parameters of software or hardware instruments, effects, mixers and recording devices.

MIDI was primarily designed with musical keyboards in mind, and controllers that are not keyboards were once referred to as "alternate" controllers. The standard has nonetheless proved adaptable, and a wide variety of devices and instruments are now able to generate or respond to MIDI information.

There is no clear definition of a MIDI controller: there are many purpose-built controllers designed to resemble instruments, but many electronic instruments not explicitly designed to be MIDI controllers (such as hardware synthesizers) and other tools such as music sequencers and audio control surfaces can also produce MIDI output. Various devices use MIDI Machine Control (MMC) messages to synchronize playback across hardware, and MIDI Show Control (MSC) commands can even be used to coordinate sound, lighting and pyrotechnics in theatrical productions.

In the narrow sense, most purpose-built musical MIDI controllers feature some prominent interface that the performer presses, touches, strikes or blows to send note information. They are often also equipped with a number of buttons, wheels, knobs, sliders, pedals, or other sensors for sending control change events: these can be used to control parameters such as velocity and pitch bend within other physical devices or software synthesizers, providing another dimension of control for a performer.

There also exist other types of controllers, such as pitch-to-MIDI converters, which analyze the pitch or vibrations of a traditional instrument or a voice and convert it to a MIDI signal in real time. Such devices have included the Roland CP-40 and the Fairlight Voicetracker, although these would usually now be replaced with pitch-tracking software. Specific guitar-to-MIDI interfaces, often attached to a guitar using a special pickup, have included the Shadow SH075, the IVL Pitchrider, and the Roland GI-10.

MIDI controllers are conventionally connected to other devices using a MIDI cable, but an increasing number support USB, which is more versatile and widely used. Software applications still recognize such controllers as MIDI devices, and a USB-equipped controller can normally draw all of the power it needs via a USB connection, removing the need for an AC adapter.

=== Keyboards ===
Keyboards are by far the most common type of MIDI controller and are available in various sizes, ordinarily from 25 to 88 keys. When a key is played, the MIDI controller sends MIDI data describing the pitch of the note and its duration—most MIDI keyboards also send data about the velocity with which a key is pressed. MIDI keyboards normally include pitch wheels, modulation wheels, and sockets for pedals (especially sustain pedals), as well as controls that transpose the pitch values of notes played by the performer between octaves.

Many keyboard controllers allow the playing area to be divided into zones, with each zone assignable to a different MIDI channel and configurable to cover a specified range of notes. This allows a single playing surface to control a number of different devices. MIDI capabilities can also be built into traditional keyboard instruments such as grand pianos and Rhodes pianos. Pedal keyboards can operate the pedal tones of a MIDI organ, or can drive a bass synthesizer. Many keytars—keyboards worn with a shoulder strap and held like a guitar—produce MIDI output as well.

=== Drum and percussion controllers ===
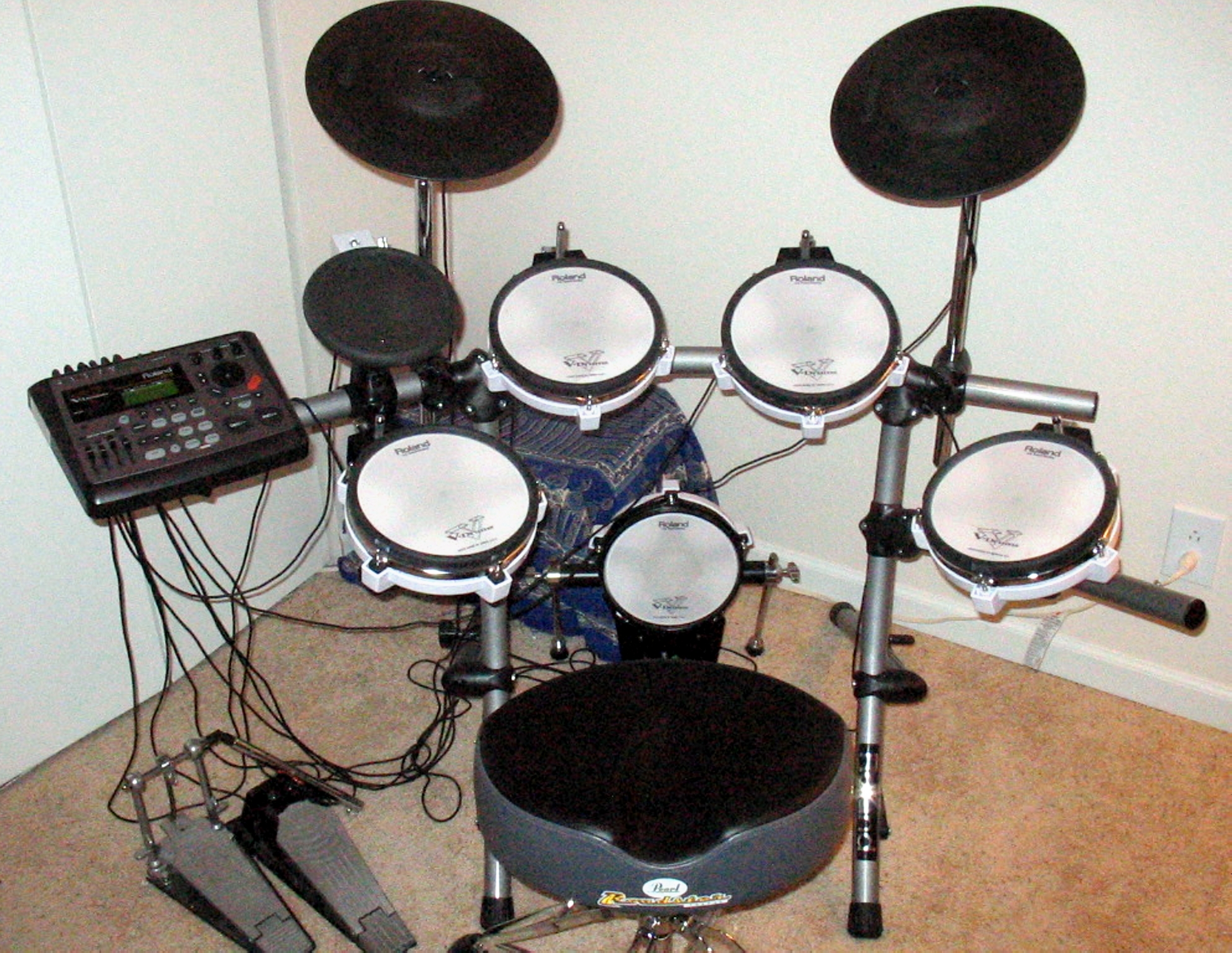
Some drum controllers such as the Roland V-Drums resemble actual drum kits. The unit's sound module is mounted to the left.

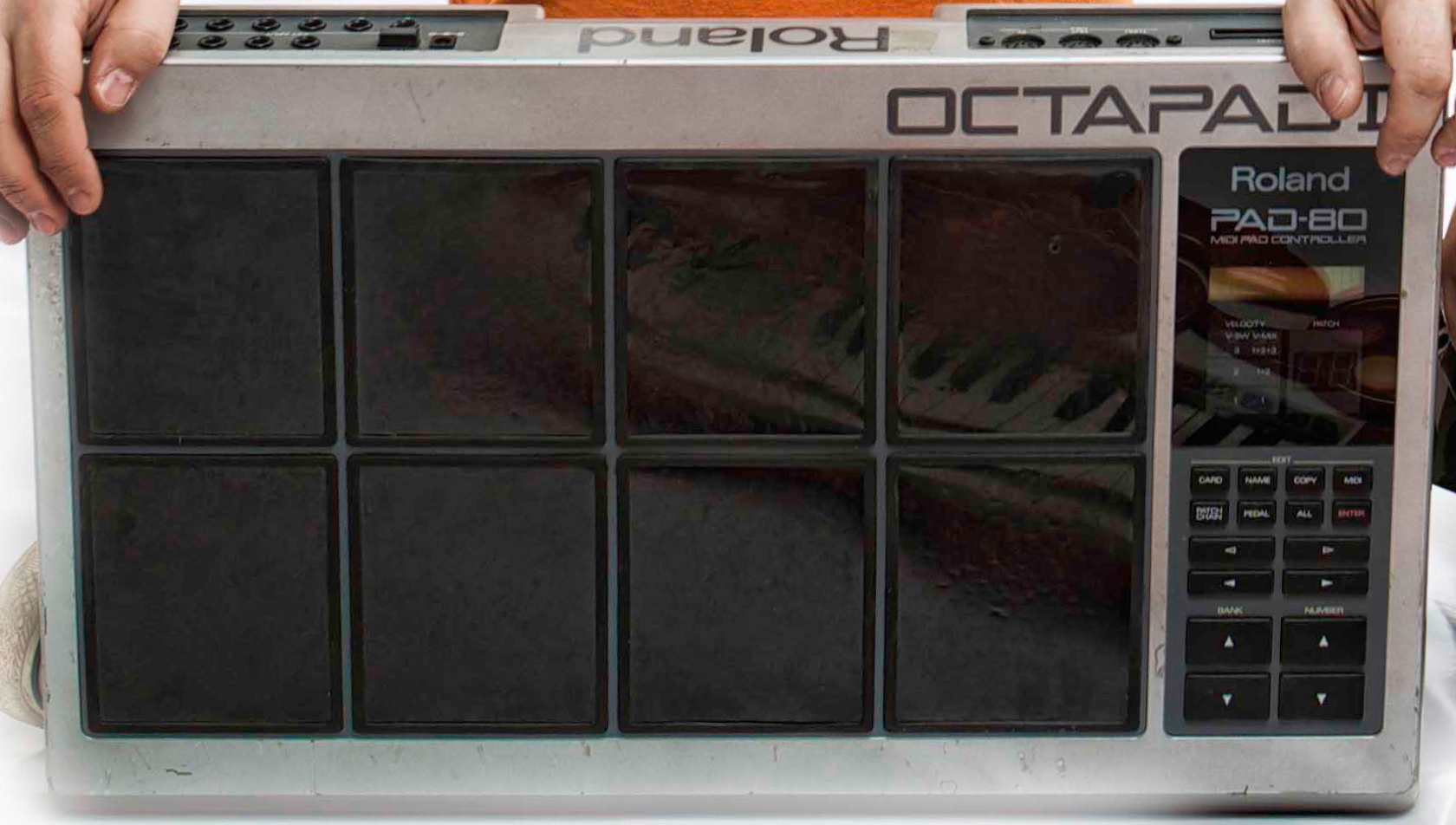
Other drum controllers, like the Roland PAD-80 Octapad II, consist of velocity-sensitive drum pads arranged in a grid.

Drum controllers are the second most common type of MIDI controller. Drum controllers may be built into drum machines, may be standalone control surfaces, or may emulate the look and feel of acoustic percussion instruments. MIDI triggers can also be installed into acoustic drum and percussion instruments. The pads built into drum machines are typically too small and fragile to be played with sticks, and are played with fingers. Dedicated drum pads such as the Roland Octapad or the DrumKAT are playable with the hands or with sticks. There are also percussion controllers such as the vibraphone-style MalletKAT, and Marimba Lumina. Pads that can trigger a MIDI device can be homemade from a piezoelectric sensor and a practice pad or other piece of foam rubber.

=== Wind controllers ===
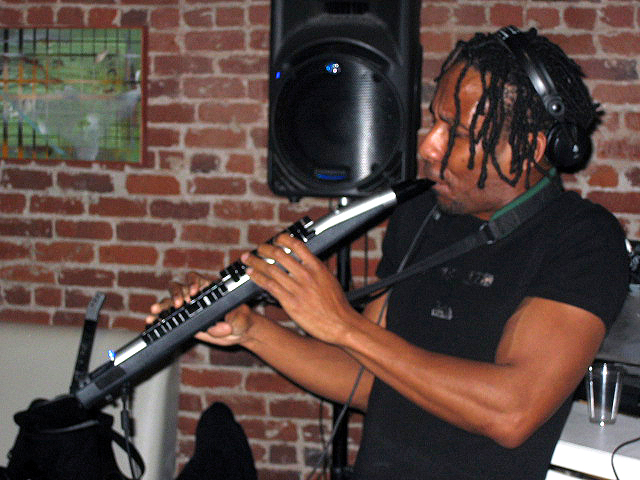
Onyx Ashanti playing a MIDI wind controller, which can produce expressive, natural-sounding performances

Wind controllers allow MIDI parts to be played with the same kind of expression and articulation that is available to players of wind and brass instruments. They allow breath and pitch glide control that provide a more versatile kind of phrasing, particularly when playing sampled or physically modeled wind instrument parts. A typical wind controller has a sensor that converts breath pressure to volume information and may allow pitch control through a lip pressure sensor and a pitch-bend wheel. Some models include a configurable key layout that can emulate different instruments' fingering systems. Examples of such controllers include Akai's Electronic Wind Instrument (EWI) and Electronic Valve Instrument (EVI). The EWI uses a system of keypads and rollers modeled after a traditional woodwind instrument, while the EVI is based on an acoustic brass instrument, and has three switches that emulate a trumpet's valves.

Simpler breath controllers are also available. Unlike wind controllers, they do not trigger notes and are intended for use in conjunction with a keyboard or synthesizer.

=== Stringed instrument controllers ===
A guitar can be fitted with special pickups that digitize the instrument's output and allow it to play a synthesizer's sounds. These assign a separate MIDI channel for each string, and may give the player the choice of triggering the same sound from all six strings or playing a different sound from each. Some models, such as Yamaha's G10, dispense with the traditional guitar body and replace it with electronics. Other systems, such as Roland's MIDI pickups, are included with or can be retrofitted to a standard instrument. Max Mathews designed a MIDI violin for Laurie Anderson in the mid-1980s, and MIDI-equipped violas, cellos, contrabasses, and mandolins also exist. Other string controllers such as the Starr Labs Ztar use a combination of fretboard keys and strings to trigger notes without needing a MIDI pickup.

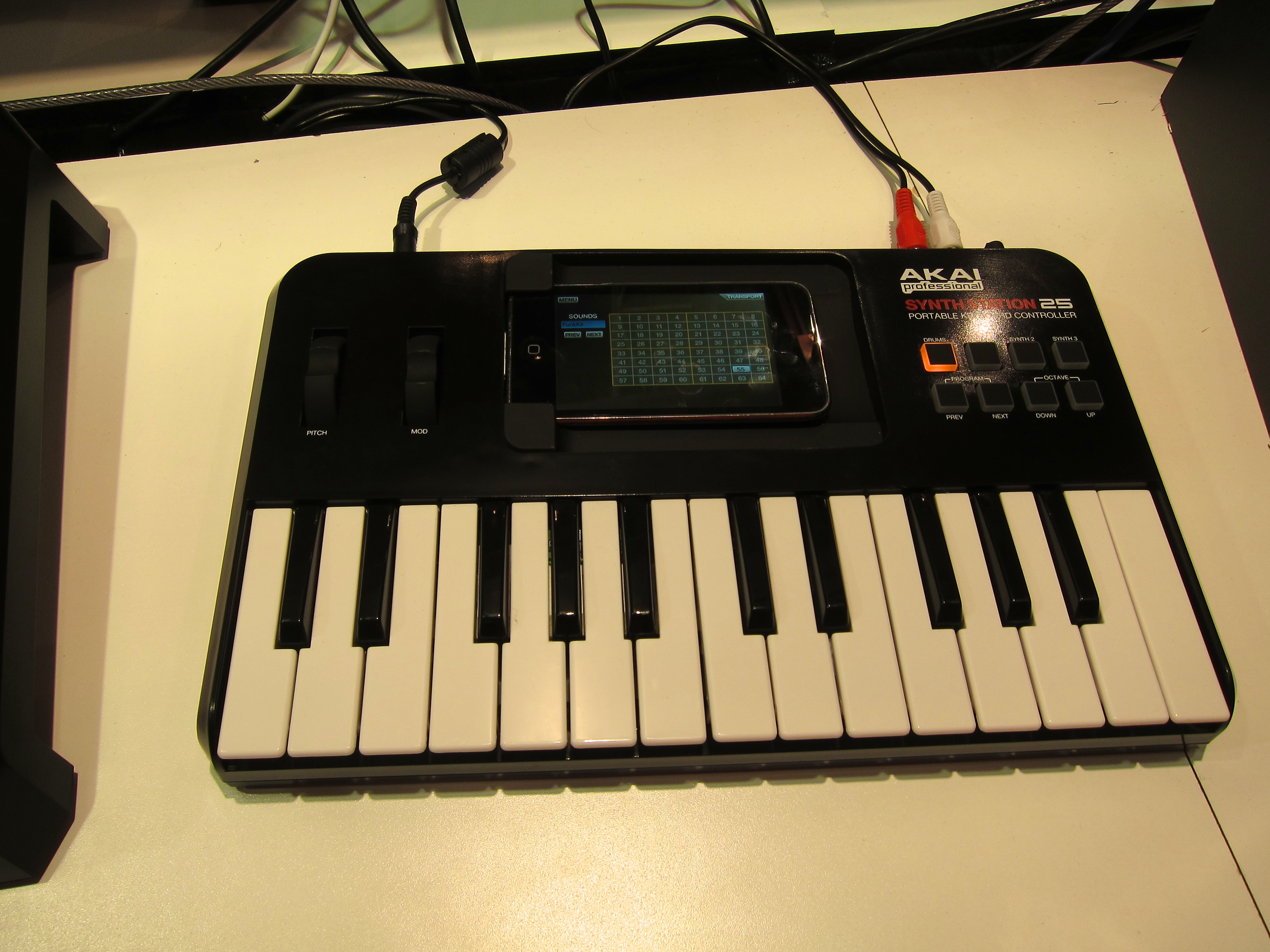
A MIDI controller designed for use with a smartphone. The phone docks in the center.

=== Specialized and experimental controllers ===
DJ digital controllers may be standalone units or may be integrated with a specific piece of software. These typically respond to MIDI clock sync and provide control over mixing, looping, effects, and sample playback.

MIDI triggers attached to shoes or clothing are sometimes used by stage performers. The Kroonde Gamma wireless sensor can capture physical motion as MIDI signals. Sensors built into a dance floor at the University of Texas at Austin convert dancers' movements into MIDI messages, and David Rokeby's Very Nervous System art installation created music from the movements of passers-through. Software applications exist which enable the use of iOS devices as gesture controllers.

Numerous experimental controllers exist which abandon traditional musical interfaces entirely. These include the gesture-controlled Buchla Thunder, sonomes such as the C-Thru Music Axis, which rearrange the scale tones into an isometric layout, and Haken Audio's keyless, touch-sensitive Continuum playing surface. Experimental MIDI controllers may be created from unusual objects, such as an ironing board with heat sensors installed, or a sofa equipped with pressure sensors. GRIDI is a large scale physical MIDI sequencer with embedded LEDs developed by Yuvi Gerstein in 2015, which uses balls as inputs. The Eigenharp controller is a combination of a breath controller, a configurable series of multi-dimensional control keys, and ribbon controllers designed to control its own virtual instrument software.

== Auxiliary controllers ==
Software synthesizers offer great power and versatility, but some players argue that division of attention between a MIDI keyboard and a computer keyboard and mouse robs some of the immediacy of the playing experience. Devices dedicated to real-time MIDI control provide an ergonomic benefit and can provide a sense of connection with the instrument that an interface that is accessed through a mouse and computer keyboard may not for keyboardists.

Controllers may be general-purpose devices that are designed to work with a variety of equipment, or they may be designed to work with a specific piece of software. Examples of the latter include Akai's APC40 controller or Nakedboards MC-8 for Ableton Live, and Korg's MS-20ic controller, which is a reproduction of their MS-20 analog synthesizer. The MS-20ic controller includes patch cables that can be used to control signal routing in their virtual reproduction of the MS-20 synthesizer and can also control third-party devices.

=== Control surfaces ===
Control surfaces are hardware devices that provide a variety of controls that transmit real-time controller messages. These enable software instruments to be programmed without the discomfort of excessive mouse movements, or adjustment of hardware devices without the need to step through layered menus. Buttons, sliders, and knobs are the most common controllers provided, but rotary encoders, transport controls, joysticks, ribbon controllers, vector touchpads in the style of Korg's Kaoss pad, and optical controllers such as Roland's D-Beam may also be present. Control surfaces may be used for mixing, sequencer automation, turntablism, and lighting control.

=== Specialized real-time controllers ===
Audio control surfaces often resemble mixing consoles in appearance, and enable a level of hands-on control for changing parameters such as sound levels and effects applied to individual tracks of a multitrack recording or channels supporting a live performance.

MIDI footswitches are commonly used to send MIDI program change commands to effects devices but may be combined with a pedalboard for more detailed adjustment of effects units. Pedals are available in the form of on/off switches, either momentary or latching or as expression pedals whose position determines the value of a MIDI continuous controller.

Drawbar controllers are for use with MIDI and virtual organs. Along with a set of drawbars for timbre control, they may provide controls for standard organ effects such as Leslie speaker speed, vibrato and chorus.

== Use in a data stream ==
Modifiers such as modulation wheels, pitch bend wheels, sustain pedals, pitch sliders, buttons, knobs, faders, switches, and ribbon controllers alter an instrument's state of operation, and thus can be used to modify sounds or other parameters of music performance in real time via MIDI connections.

Some controllers, such as pitch bend, are special. Whereas the data range of most continuous controllers (such as volume, for example) consists of 128 steps ranging in value from 0 to 127, pitch bend data may be encoded with over 16,000 data steps. This produces the illusion of a continuously sliding pitch, as in a violin's portamento, rather than a series of zippered steps such as a guitarist sliding their finger up the frets of their guitar's neck.

The original MIDI specification included 128 virtual controller numbers for real-time modifications to live instruments or their audio. MIDI Show Control (MSC) and MIDI Machine Control (MMC) are two separate extensions of the original MIDI spec, expanding the MIDI protocol to accept far more than its original intentions.
