= MIDI keyboard =

Piano-style keyboard that sends MIDI commands to a computer or device

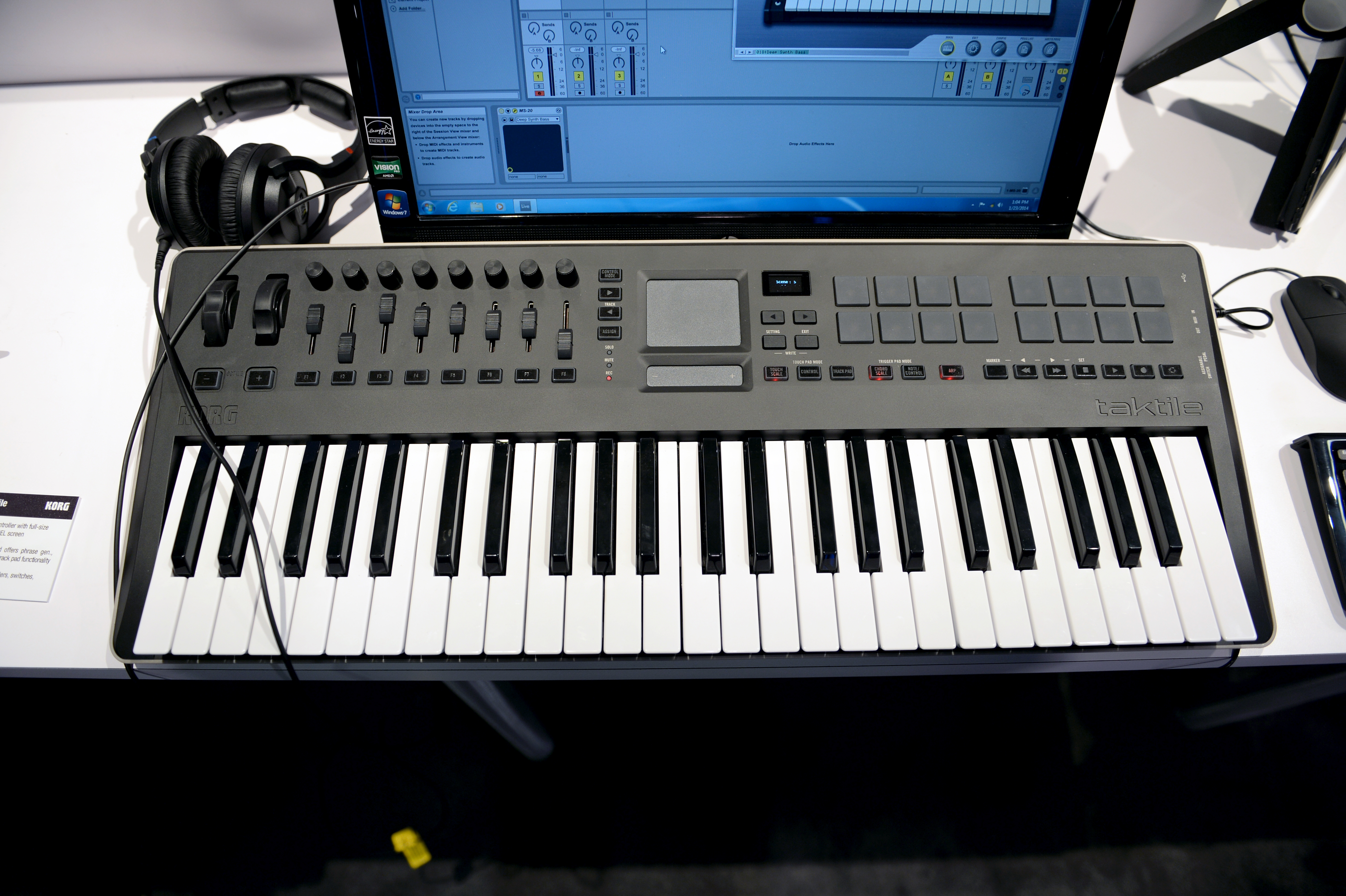
Korg Taktile USB MIDI Controller Keyboard - with PC - 2014 NAMM Show, one style of MIDI keyboard based on the piano user interface

A MIDI keyboard or controller keyboard is typically a piano-style electronic musical keyboard, often with other buttons, wheels and sliders, used as a MIDI controller for sending Musical Instrument Digital Interface (MIDI) commands over a USB or MIDI 5-pin cable to other musical devices or computers. MIDI keyboards lacking an onboard sound module cannot produce sounds themselves, however, some models of MIDI keyboards contain both a MIDI controller and sound module.

When it is used as a MIDI controller, MIDI information on keys or buttons the performer has pressed is sent to a receiving device capable of creating sound through modeling synthesis, sample playback, or an analog hardware instrument. The receiving device could be:

- a computer running a digital audio workstation (DAW) or a standalone audio plugin (alternatively, the computer could be used to re-route the MIDI signal to other devices)
- a sound module
- a digital (digital piano/stage piano) or analog (synthesizer) hardware instrument with MIDI capability, such as a drum machine

While many digital and analog hardware keyboards in the aforementioned categories of digital piano, stage piano, and synthesizer can be used as MIDI controllers if they have MIDI capability, they often do not offer the same level of software integration and number of MIDI-mappable controls as a dedicated MIDI keyboard. MIDI keyboards are often utilized by individuals who work with DAWs and software instruments, from hobbyists to professional musicians working in recording studios or concert stages.

== Gallery ==
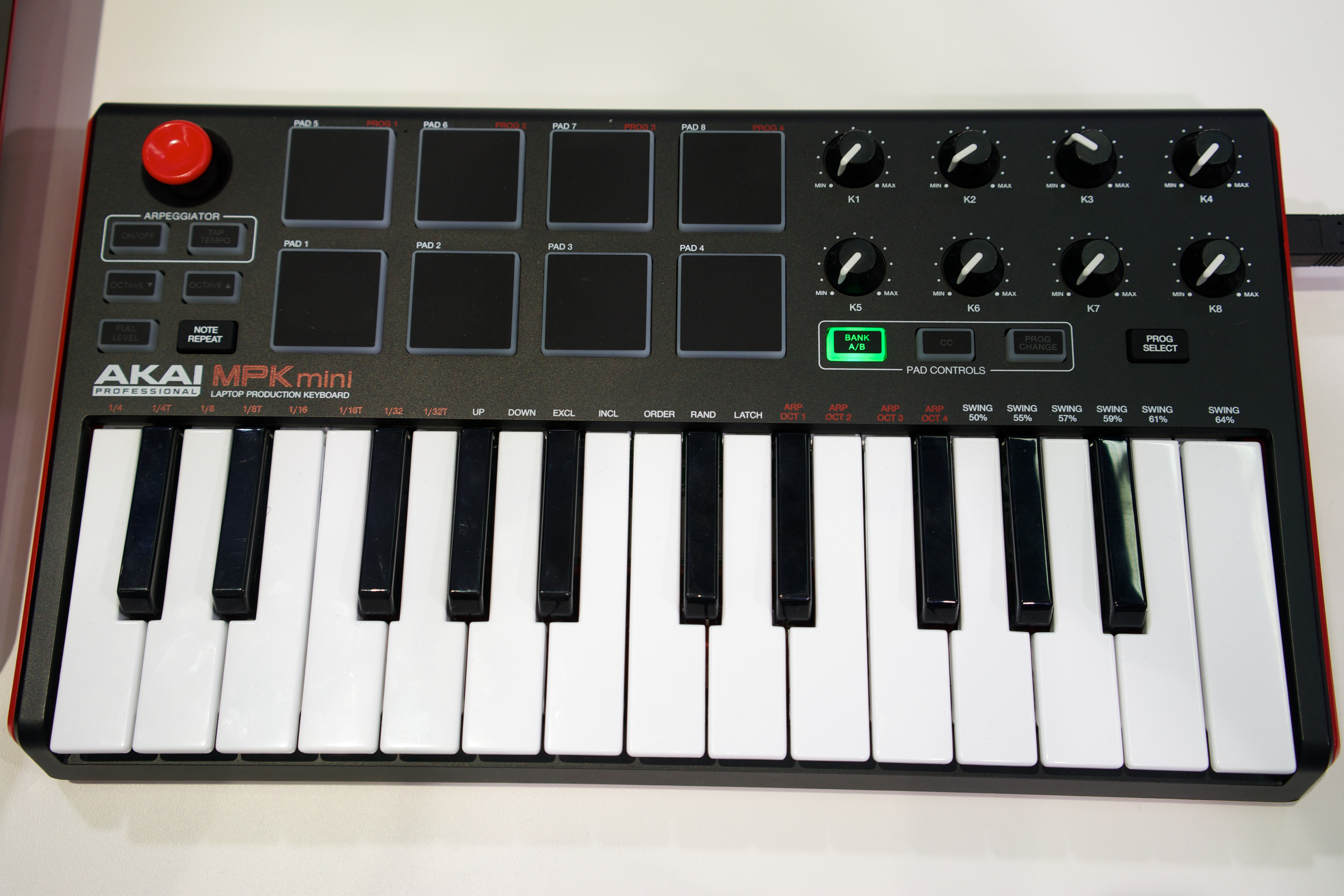
Akai MPK mini MK2

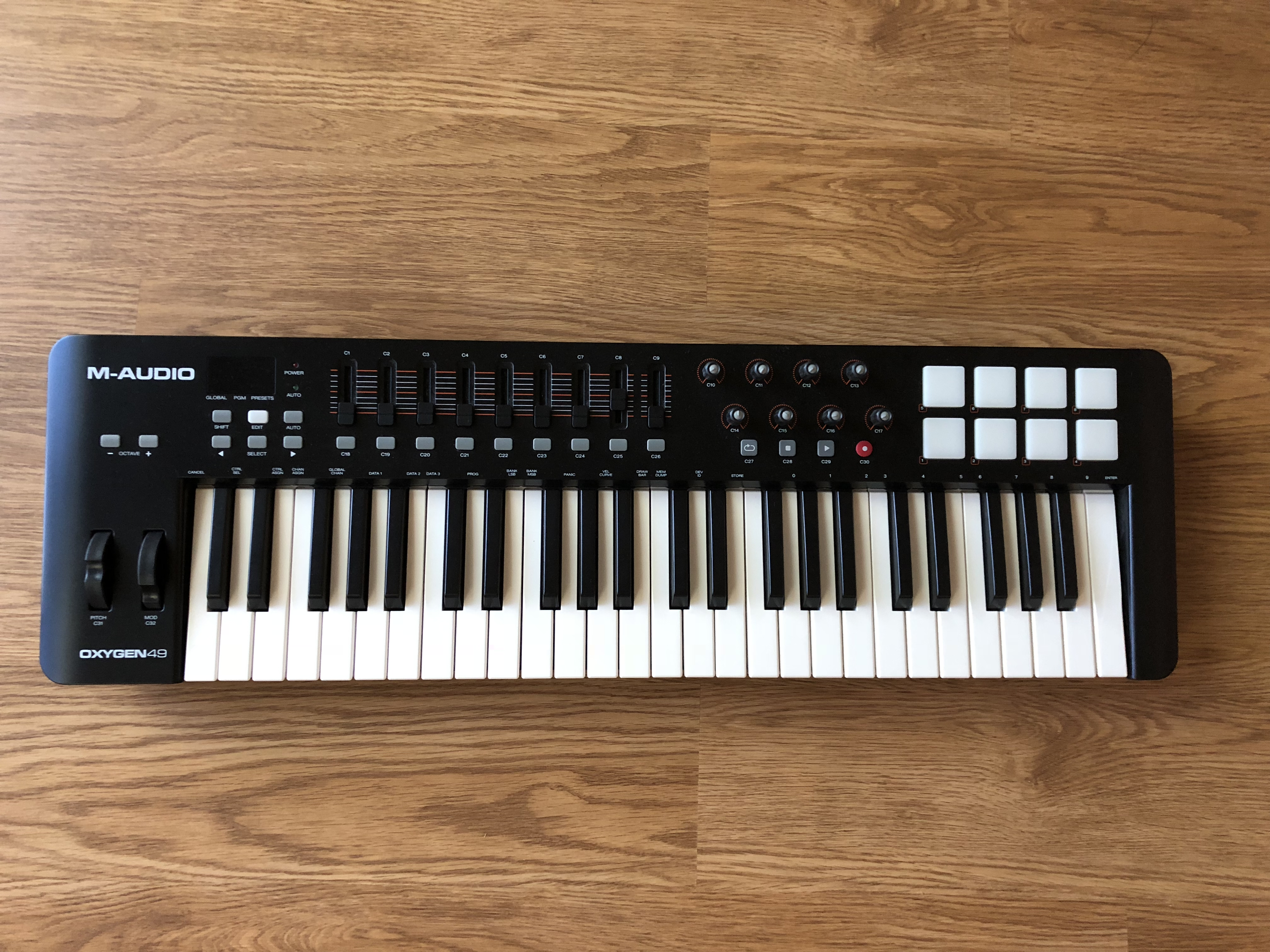
M-Audio Oxygen 49

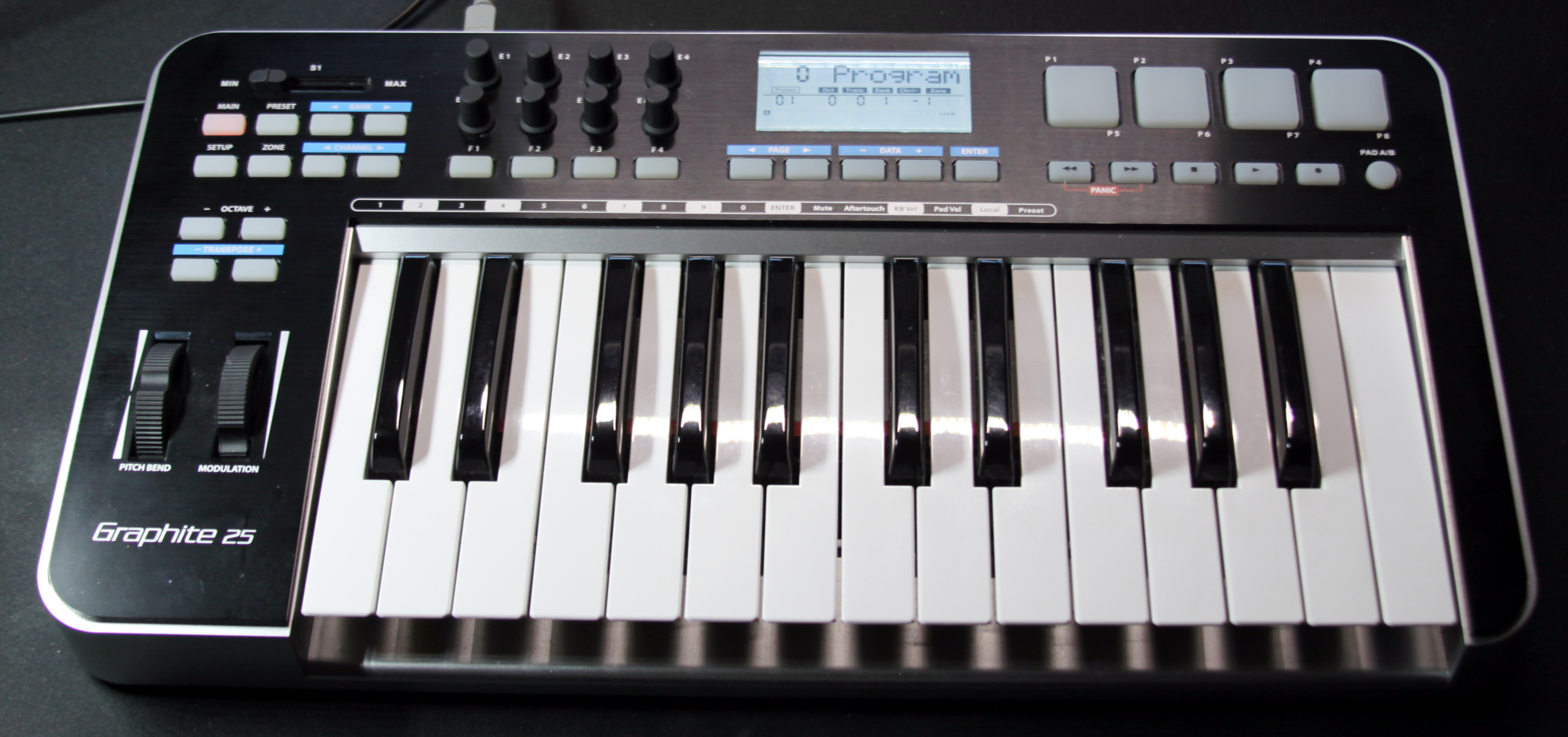
Samson Graphite 25

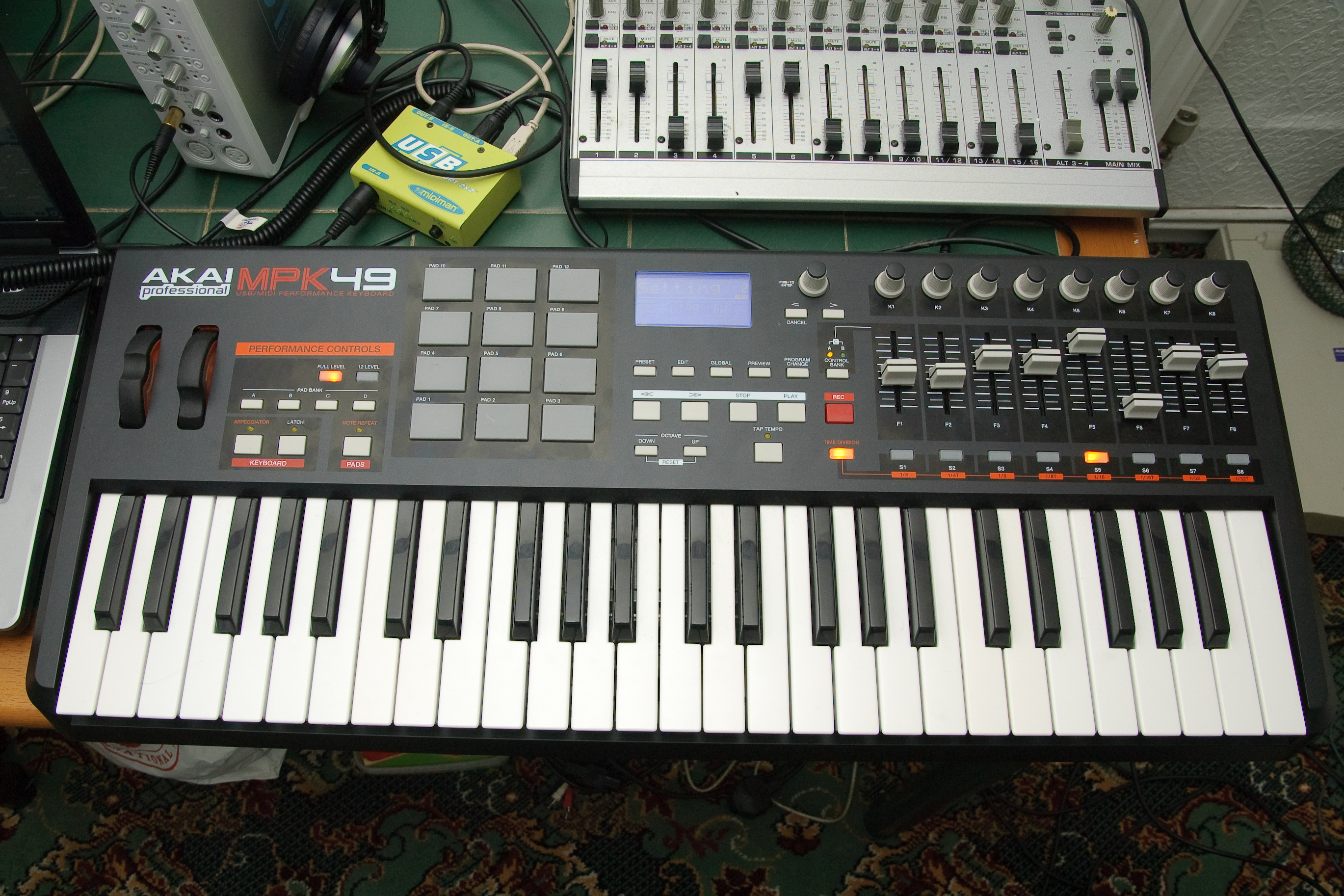
Akai MPK49

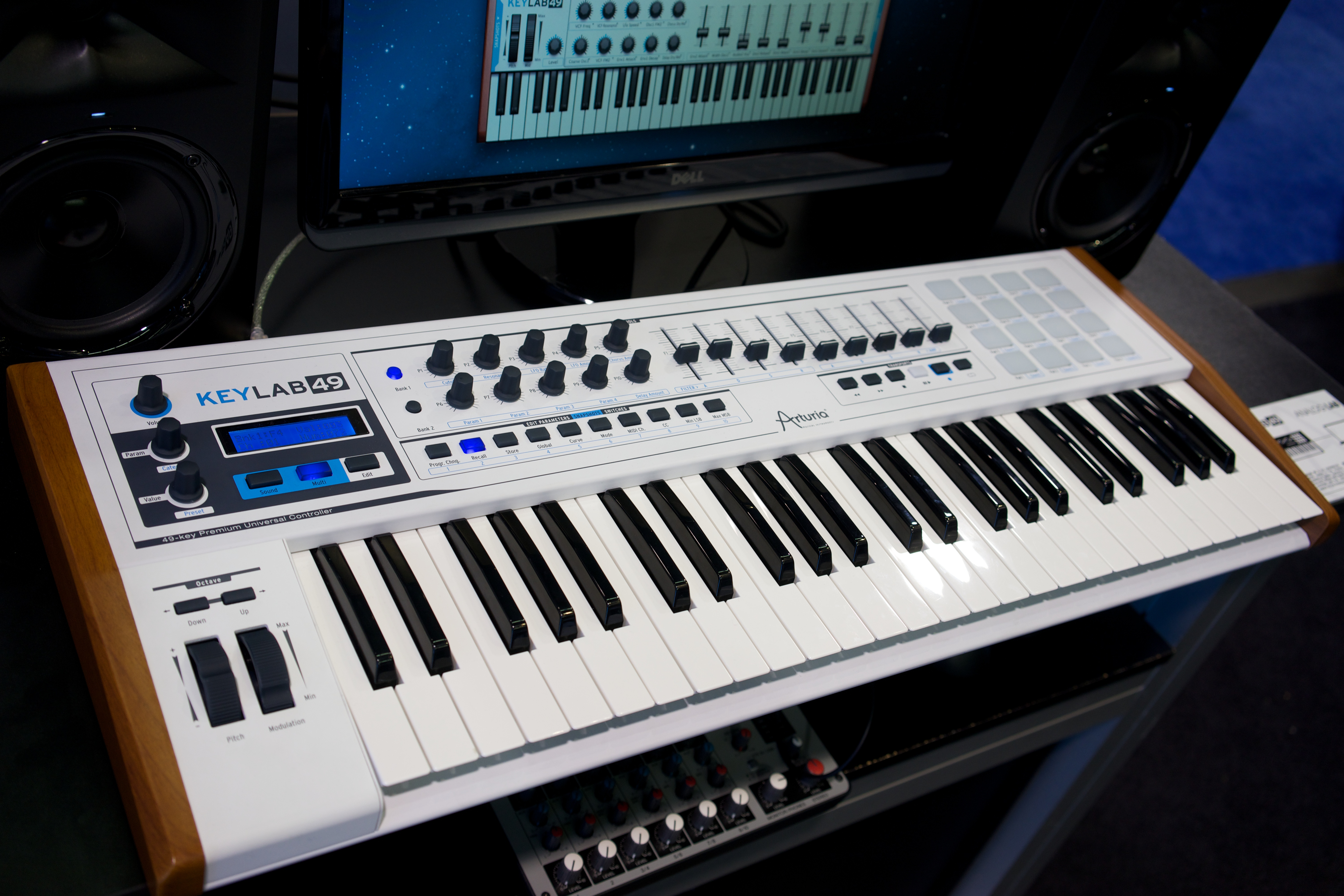
Arturia KeyLab 49
