= Audio control surface =

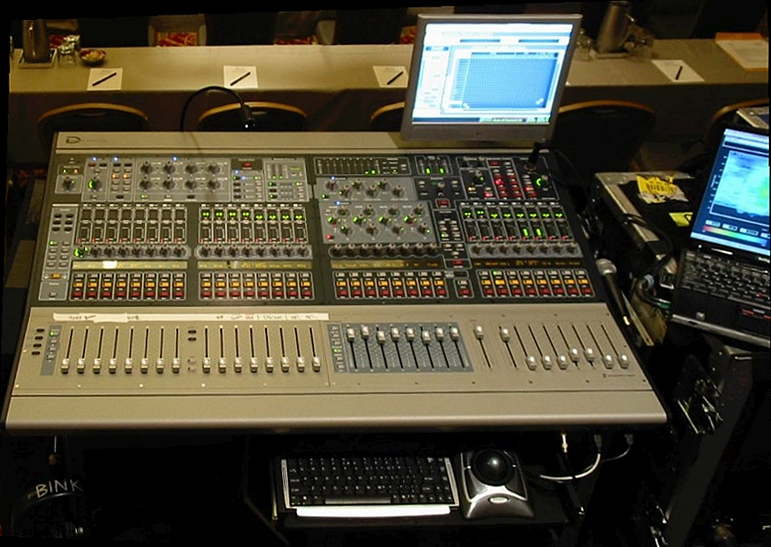
A large control surface, the Digidesign Profile. This surface connects to the mixing hardware by way of four coaxial cables.

In the domain of digital audio, a control surface is a human interface device (HID) that allows the user to control a digital audio workstation or other digital audio application. Generally, a control surface will contain one or more controls that can be assigned to parameters in the software, allowing tactile control of the software. As digital audio software is complex and can play any number of functions in the audio chain, control surfaces can be used to control many aspects of music production, including virtual instruments, samplers, signal processors, mixers, DJ software, and music sequencers.

A control surface is a physical interface, often resembling an analog Mixing console, used to manage your DAW (Digital audio workstation), plug-ins, and other audio software. There are many configurations of control surfaces. They can contain a single fader like the Sparrow 3x100mm, to a large advanced console like the Avid S6. Control surfaces often features faders, knobs (rotary encoders), and buttons that can be assigned to parameters in the software. Other control surfaces are designed to give a musician control over the sequencer while recording, and thus provide transport controls (remote control of record, playback and song position). Control surfaces are often incorporated into MIDI controllers to give the musician more control over an instrument. Control surfaces with motorized faders can read and write mix automation.

The control surface connects to the host computer via many different interfaces. MIDI was the first major interface created for this purpose, although many devices now use USB, FireWire, or Ethernet.

== History ==
In the 1950s, the history of Mixing Control Surfaces began with the Altec Revocon remote mixing controller for sound reinforcement. It was the first type of equipment that allowed a sound engineer to control a backstage or booth mixer from anywhere in the audience or space that they were in, with motorized controls on the mixer. Soon after, in the 1960s, Fairchild introduced the Integra Control Surface mixers. These mixers were the first ones that incorporated channel strips that look like fader channels today. The Integra Control Surface controlled a rack mixer using LDR (light-dependent resistors) and reed relays. The next major development happened another decade later in the 1970s when motorized faders (flying Faders) were invented. This allowed for the integration of mix automation capabilities into consoles, allowing the position of the physical faders to correspond with automation data. A good example of this is if there needed to be a fade out. The automation data would tell the fader from its current position down to 0 over the specified time period. This technology was expensive at first, but the products improved through the 1980s allowing the cost to decrease and making them more commonplace.

Robert Moog introduced the first MIDI keyboards in 1982, which are control surfaces. Shortly after, Sequential Circuits released the Prophet 600, which was a keyboard with a MIDI interface, as well as Roland releasing the MPU-401, which offered software that allowed the device to communicate directly with a PC. Both were released in 1983.

== Types of Controls on Control Surfaces ==
=== Non-Motorized Faders ===
Traditional slider-style level controls. They work well in a live production environment, listening to others while creating music, and providing playback to DJs when looping. They are not recommended for mixing with DAWS due to the lack of data output.

=== Motorized Faders ===
The faders are motorized for playback of a mix. They represent the physical position of a channel's level at a specific position in a mix's timeline. You can create new data by grabbing it during the mix, and it will overwrite what is there.

=== Buttons ===
Often will have an LED to indicate on or off. They can indicate channel mutes, solo sends, talkback, or perform navigation within a menu.

=== Transport Controls ===
These are the buttons that look like a conventional tape. They allow you to play, stop, fast forward.

=== Display/Meters ===
Mimics the meters on screen on the DAW's computer display. It may show different settings, levels, routing, time code, and other information.

== Examples ==
- Smart AV Tango - A hybrid controller with a 22" touch screen, compatible with major DAWs for MAC & PC.
- M-Audio ProjectMix - Control surface that can control many different applications.
- Mackie Control - Serves a similar purpose as the ProjectMix.
