= Mix automation =

Method to automate the process of post-production mixing of music recording

In music recording, mix automation allows the mixing console to remember the mixing engineer's dynamic adjustment of faders during a musical piece in the post-production editing process. A timecode is necessary for the synchronization of automation. Modern mixing consoles and digital audio workstations use comprehensive mix automation.

The need for automated mixing originated from the late 1970s transition form 8-track to 16-track and then 24-track multitrack recording, as mixing could be laborious and require multiple people and hands, and the results could be almost impossible to reproduce. With 48-track recording - synchronized twin 24-track recorders (for a net 46 audio tracks, with one on each machine for SMPTE timecode) - came larger recording and mixing consoles with even more channel faders to manage during mixdown. Manufacturers, such as Neve Electronics (now AMS Neve) and Solid State Logic (SSL), both English companies, developed systems that enabled one engineer to oversee every detail of a complex mix, although the computers required to power these desks remained a rarity into the late 1970s.

According to record producer Roy Thomas Baker, Queen's 1975 single "Bohemian Rhapsody" was one of the first mixes to be done with automation.

== Types ==
Voltage Controlled Automation
fader levels are regulated by voltage-controlled amplifiers (VCA). VCAs control the audio level and not the actual fader.
Moving Fader Automation
a motor is attached to the fader, which then can be controlled by the console, digital audio workstation (DAW), or user.
Software Controlled Automation
the software can be internal to the console, or external as part of a DAW. The virtual fader can be adjusted in the software by the user.
MIDI Automation
the communications protocol MIDI can be used to send messages to the console to control automation.

== Modes ==
Write
Used the first time automation is created or when writing over existing automation.
Touch
Writes automation data only while a fader is touched. faders return to any previously automated position after release.
Latch
Starts writing automation data when a fader is touched. Stays in position and continues writing after release.
Read
The console or digital audio workstation performs the written automation.
Off
Automation is temporarily disabled, Current manual settings are used.

All of these include the mute button. If mute is pressed during writing of automation, the audio track will be muted during playback of that automation. Depending on software, other parameters such as panning, sends, and plug-in controls can be automated as well. In some cases, automation can be written using a digital potentiometer instead of a fader.

== See also ==
- Collaborative real-time editor
