= List of music sequencers =

Music sequencers are hardware devices or application software that can record, edit, or play back music, by handling note and performance information.

== Hardware sequencers ==
Many synthesizers, and by definition all music workstations, groove machines and drum machines, contain their own sequencers.

The following are specifically designed to function primarily as the music sequencers:

=== Rotating object with pins or holes ===
- Barrel or cylinder with pins (since 9th or 14th century) — utilized on barrel organs, carillons, music boxes
- Metal disc with punched holes (late 18th century) — utilized on several music boxes such as Polyphon, Regina, Symphonion, Ariston, Graphonola (early version), etc.

=== Punched paper ===
- Book music (since 1890) for pneumatics system — utilized on several mechanical organs
- Music roll for pneumatics system — utilized on player pianos (using piano rolls), Orchestrions, several mechanical organs, etc.
- Punch tape system for earliest studio synthesizers
  - RCA Mark II Sound Synthesizer by Herbert Belar and Harry Olson at RCA, a room-filling device built in 1957 for half a million dollars. Included a 4-polyphony synth with 12 oscillators, a sequencer fed with wide paper tape, with output recorded by a disc cutting lathe.
  - Siemens Synthesizer (1959) at Siemens-Studio für elektronische Musik

=== Sound-on-film ===
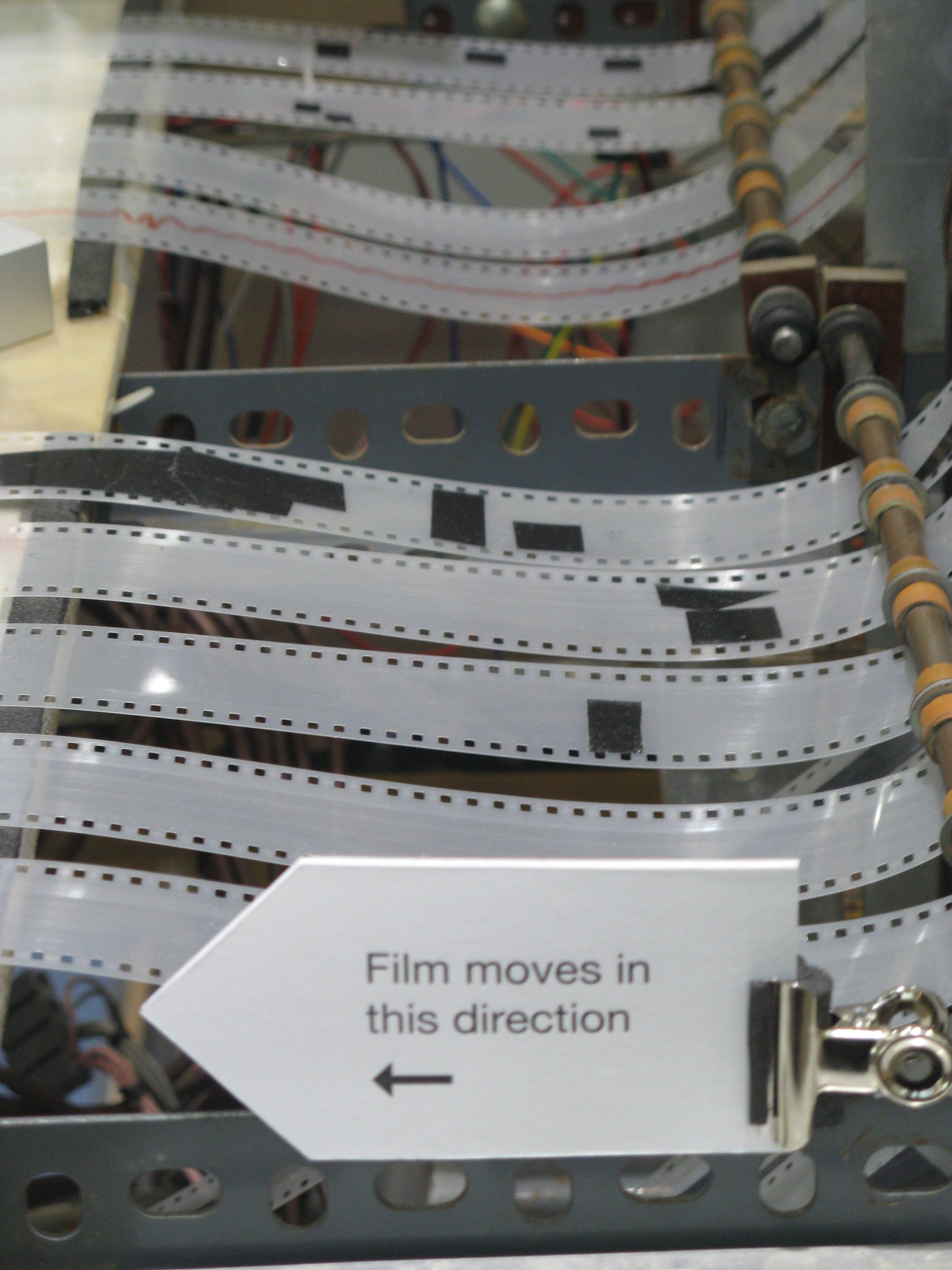
Oramics (1957) controls sounds by graphics on films

- Variophone (1930) by Evgeny Sholpo—on earliest version, hand drawn waves on film or disc were used to synthesize sound, and later versions were promised to experiment on musical intonations and temporal characteristics of live music performance, however not finished. Variophone is often referred as a forerunner of drawn sound system including ANS synthesizer and Oramics.
- Composer-Tron (1953) by Osmond Kendal—rhythmical sequences were controlled via marking cue on film, while timbre of note or envelope-shape of sound were defined via hand drawn shapes on a surface of a CRT input device, drawn with a grease pencil.
- ANS synthesizer (1938-1958) by Evgeny Murzin—an earliest realtime additive synthesizer using 720 microtonal sine waves (1/6 semitones × 10 octaves) generated by five glass discs. Composers could control the time evolution of amplitudes of each microtone via scratches on a glass plate user interface covered with black mastic.
- Oramics (1957) by Daphne Oram—hand drawn contours on a set of ten sprocketed synchronized strips of 35 film were used to control various parameters of monophonic sound generator (frequency, timbre, amplitude and duration). Polyphonic sounds were obtained using multitrack recording technique.

=== Electro-mechanical sequencers ===
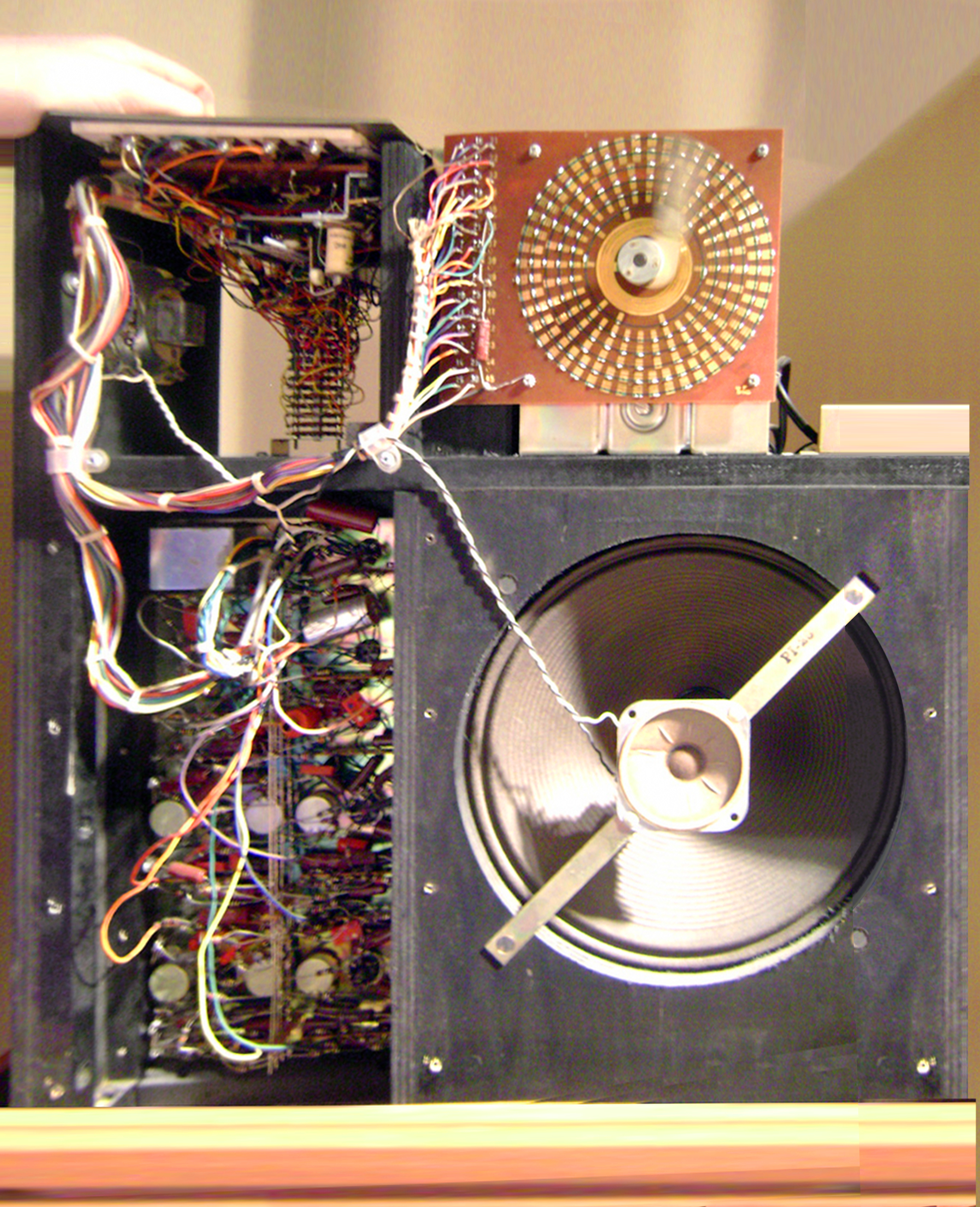
Wurlitzer Sideman (1959)

- Wall of Sound (mid-1940s–1950s) by Raymond Scott—early electro-mechanical sequencer developed by Raymond Scott to produce rhythmic patterns, consistent with stepping relays, solenoids, and tone generators
- Circle Machine (1959) by Raymond Scott—electro-optical rotary sequencer developed by Raymond Scott to generate arbitrary waveforms, consistent with dimmer bulbs arranged in a ring, and a rotating arm with photocell scanning over the ring
- Wurlitzer Sideman (1959)—first commercial drum machine; rhythm patterns were electro-mechanically generated by rotating disk switches, and drum sounds were electronically generated by vacuum-tube circuits

=== Analog sequencers ===
==== Analog sequencers with CV/Gate interface ====
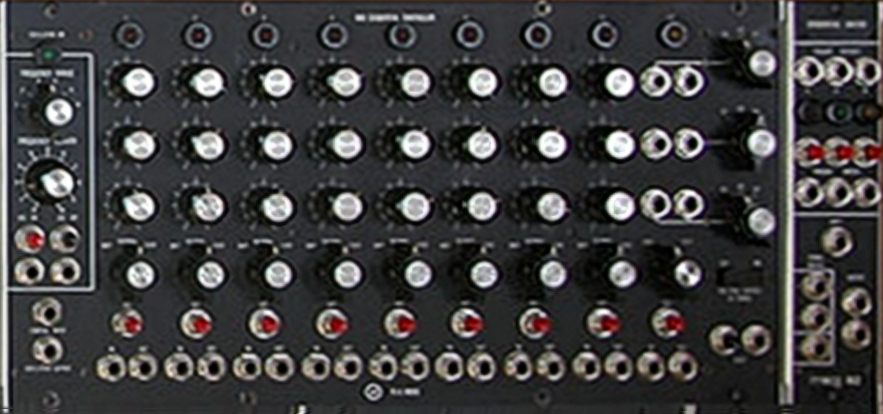
Moog 960 Sequential Controller and 962 Sequential Switch

- Buchla 100's sequencer modules (1964/1966–)
  One of the earliest analog sequencers of the modular synthesizer era since 1960. Later, Robert Moog admired Buchla's unique works including it
- Moog 960 Sequential Controller / 961 Interface / 962 Sequential Switch (c.1968)
  A popular analog sequencer module for the Moog modular synthesizer system, following the earliest Buchla sequencer
- Aries AR334 (module)
- ARP 1601 and 1027 (module)
- Buchla 245, 246
- Doepfer Dark Time
- Electro Harmonix Sequencer
- EML 400
- ETI 603 (DIY project)
- genoQs Octopus-digital midi
- genoQs Nemo-digital midi
- Korg SQ-10
- MFB Urzwerg / MFB Urzwerg Pro—CV/Gate step sequencer with 8steps/4tracks or 16steps/2tracks; also synchronizable with MIDI sequencer
- Oberheim Mini Sequencer MS1A
- PAiA 4780
- Polyfusion AS1, AS1R and 2040/2041/2042/2043 modules
- PPG 313, 314
- Roland 104, 182, 717A
- Sequential Circuits Model 600
- Serge Modular TKB, SQP, SEQ8
- Steiner-Parker 151
- Synthesizers.com Q119
- Synthesizers.com Q960—reissue of Moog 960
- WMS 1020A
- Yamaha CS30 (1977)—monophonic synthesizer keyboard with built-in 8-step analog sequencer

==== Analog-style step sequencers ====
===== Analog-style MIDI step sequencers =====
Since the analog synthesizer revivals in the 1990s, newly designed MIDI sequencers with a series of knobs or sliders similar to analog sequencer have appeared. These often equip CV/Gate and DIN sync interface along with MIDI, and even patch memory for multiple sequence patterns and possibly song sequences. These analog-digital hybrid machines are often called "Analogue-style MIDI step sequencer" or "MIDI analogue sequencer", etc.

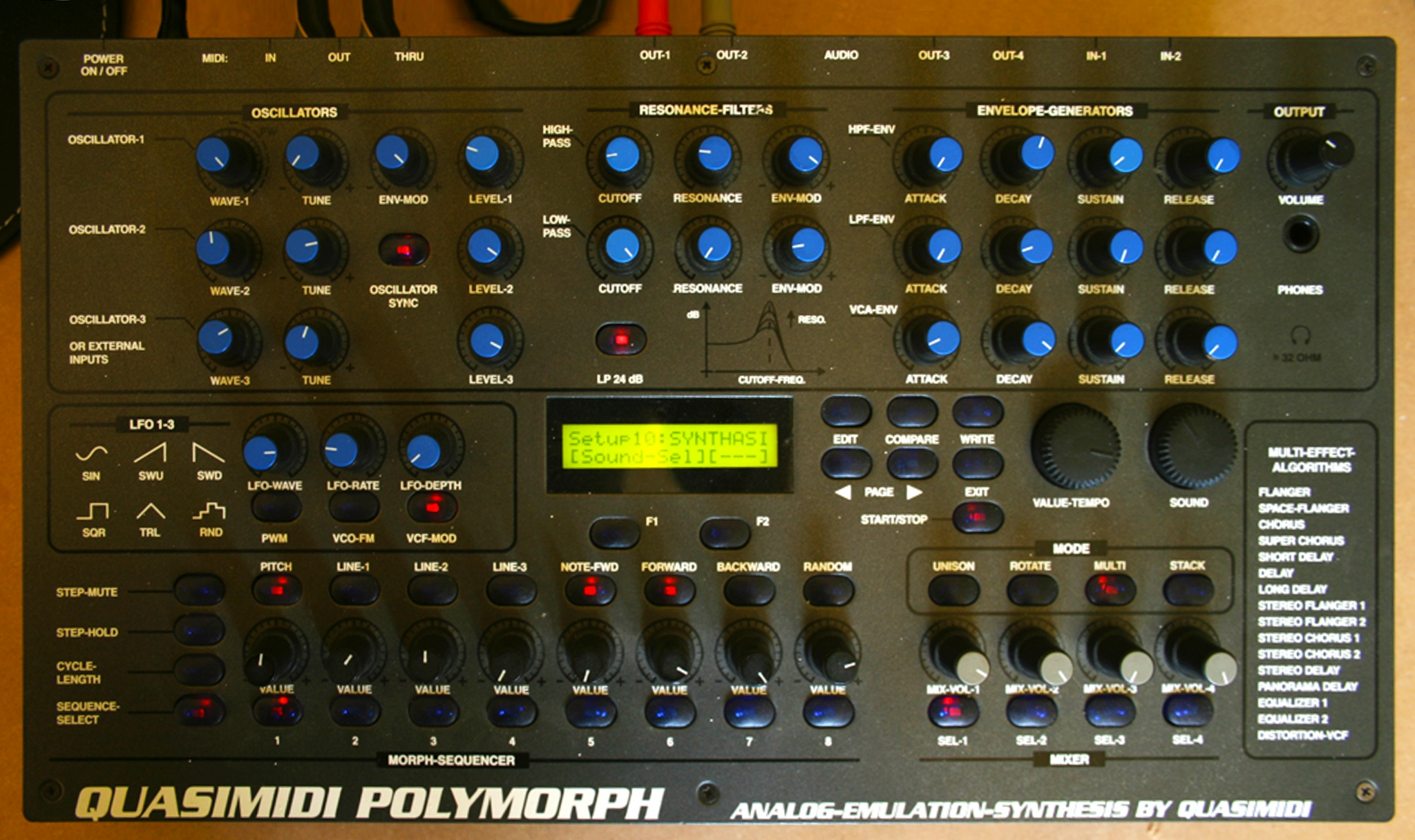
Quasimidi Polymorph (1999) has built-in step sequencer with a series of value knobs (bottom)

- Doepfer MAQ 16/3—MIDI analog sequencer, designed in cooperation with Kraftwerk
- Doepfer Regelwerk—MIDI analog sequencer with MIDI controller
- Frostwave Fat Controller
- Infection Music Phaedra
- Infection Music Zeit
- Latronic Notron
- Manikin Schrittmacher
- Quasimidi Polymorph (1999)—Four-part multitimbral tabletop synthesizer, with an analogue-like step sequencer
- Roland EF-303—Multiple effects unit with 16-step modulation, also usable as the analog-style MIDI step sequencer
- Sequentix P3

===== Analog-style MIDI pattern sequencers =====
Several machines also provide "song mode" to play the sequence of memorised patterns in specified order, as per drum machines.

- Doepfer Schaltwerk—MIDI pattern sequencer

=== Step sequencers (supported on) ===
Typical step sequencers are integrated on drum machines, bass machines, groove machines, music production machines, and these software versions. Often, these also support the semi-realtime recording mode, too.

- MFB Step 64—Standalone step sequencer dedicated for drum patterns (16 steps/4 tracks or 64 steps/1 track, 118 programs×4 banks, 16 song sequences, each with up to 128 sequences)

==== Embedded self-contained step sequencers ====
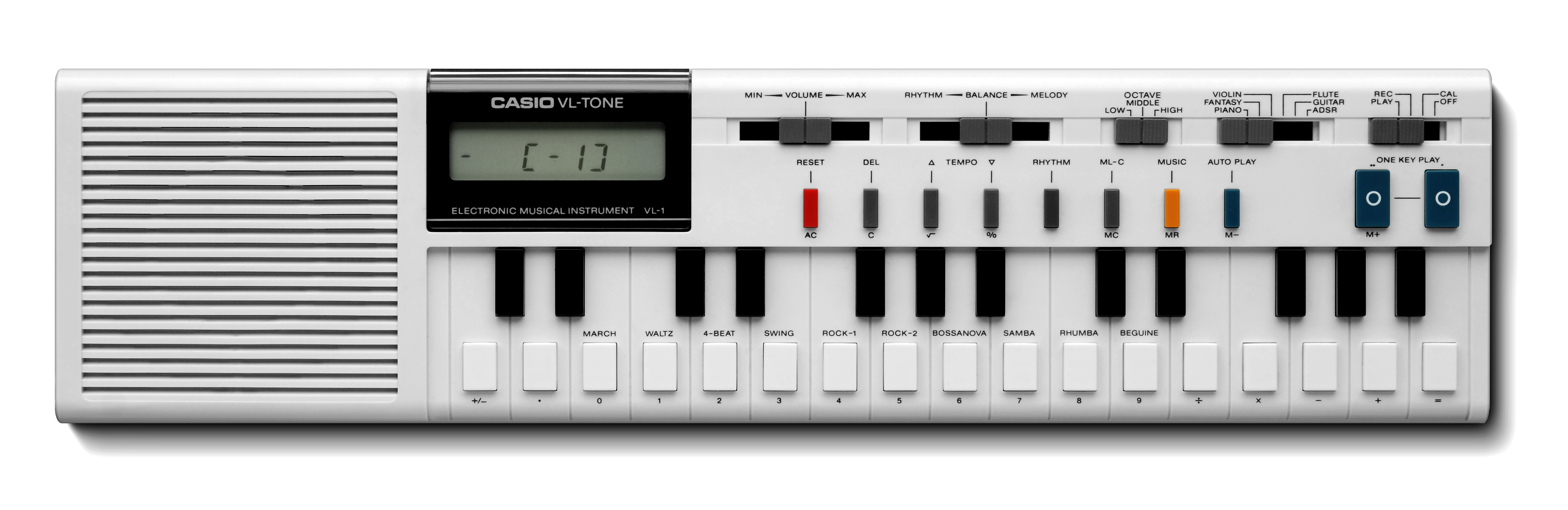
Casio VL-Tone VL-1

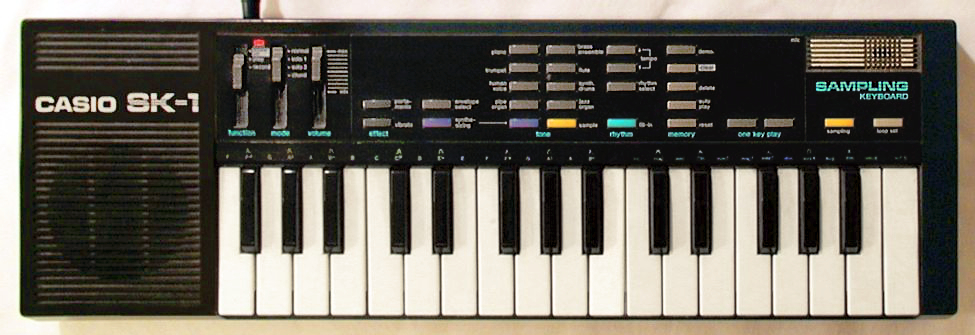
Casio Sampletone SK-1

Several tiny keyboards provide a step sequencer combined with an independent timing mode for recording and performance:

- Casio VL-Tone VL-1 (1979), Casiotone MT-70 (c.1984), Sampletone SK-1 (1986), etc.—Timings of musical notes stored on the step sequencer, can be designated by the two trigger buttons labeled "One Key Play", around the right hand position

==== Embedded CV/Gate step sequencers ====
Several machines have white and black chromatic keypads, to enter the musical phrases.

- Multivox / Firstman SQ-01 (1980)—a forerunner of TB-303
- Roland TB-303 (1981)
- Roland SH-101 (1982)—monophonic keytar synthesizer with sequencer
- Roland MC-202 (1983)—monophonic tabletop synthesizer with sequencer, similar to SH-101

==== Embedded MIDI step sequencers ====
Groovebox-type machines with white and black chromatic keypads, often support step recording mode along with realtime recording mode:

- Korg Electribe / Electribe 2 series
- Roland Corporation MC series: MC-09 / MC-303 / MC-307 / MC-505 / MC-808 / MC-909
- Yamaha RM1x
- Yamaha RS7000—Music Production Studio

Other groovebox-type machines (including several music production machines) also often support step recording mode, of course:

- Linn 9000 (1984)
- Sequential Circuits Studio 440 (1986)
- E-mu SP-12 (1986)
- E-mu SP-1200 (1987)
- Akai MPC series (1988–)
- Akai MPC Renaissance / Studio / Fly (2012)—Software with control surfaces
- Native Instruments Maschine (2009)—Software with control surface
- Roland MV-30
- Roland MV-8000—Production Studio

===== Button-grid-style step sequencers =====
Recently emerging button-grid-style interfaces/instruments are naturally support step sequence. On these machines, one axis on grid means musical scale or sample to play, and another axis means timing of notes.

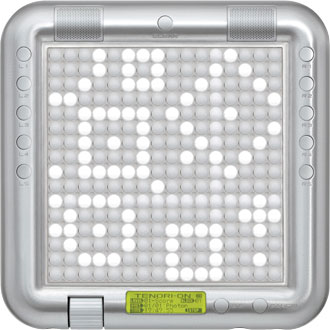
Tenori-on

- Akai APC40—interface for Ableton Live
- Arduinome—interface
- Bliptronics 5000—instrument
- Monome—interface
- Novation Launchpad—interface for Ableton Live
- Yamaha Tenori-on—instrument
- Synthstrom Deluge - Piano-roll-style sequencing on 128 pads (16×8)

In addition, newly designed hardware MIDI sequencers equipping a series of knobs/sliders similar to analog sequencers, are appeared. For details, see #Analog-style MIDI step sequencers.

=== Digital sequencers ===
==== CV/Gate ====
Also often support Gate clock and DIN sync interfaces.

- EDP Spider (late 1970s)—supported LINK and CV/Gate
- EMS Sequencer series (1971)
- Max Mathews GROOVE system (1970)
- Multivox MX-8100 / Firstman SQ-10 (1979/1980)—supported V/Oct. and Hz/V
- Oberheim DS-2 (1974)
- Roland CSQ-100
- Roland CSQ-600 (1980)—it memories 600 notes for individual 4 tracks, a buddy of TR-808
- Roland MC-4 Microcomposer (1981)
- Roland MC-8 Microcomposer (1977)—also supporting DCB via OP-8
- Sequential Circuits Model 800 (1977)

==== Proprietary digital interfaces (pre MIDI era) ====
- NED Synclavier series—CV/Gate interface and MIDI retrofit kit were available on Synclavier II. Also MIDI became standard feature on Synclavier PSMT
- Fairlight CMI series—CV/Gate interface was optionally available on Series II, and MIDI was supported on Series IIx and later models
- Oberheim DSX (Oberheim Parallel Bus)
- PPG Wave family (PPG Bus)
- Rhodes Chroma (Chroma Computer Interface)
- Roland JSQ-60 (Roland Digital Control Bus (DCB))
- Sequential Circuits PolySequencer 1005 (SCI Serial Bus)
- Yamaha CS70M (Key Code Interface)

==== Hardware MIDI sequencers ====
===== Standalone MIDI sequencers =====
- Akai ASQ10
- Alesis MMT-8—a buddy of HR-16 drum machine
- Korg SQD-1
- Korg SQD-8
- Kawai Q-80
- Roland MC-327
- Roland MC series: MC-50/MC-50MkII/MC-80/MC-300/MC-500 Microcomposer
- Roland MSQ-100 (1985)
- Roland MSQ-700 (1984)—one of the earliest multitrack MIDI sequencer (8tr), a buddy of TR-909
- Roland SB-55—SMF recorder
- Yamaha QX series: QX1/QX3/QX5/QX7/QX21

====== MIDI phrase sequencers ======
- Zyklus MPS

===== Embedded MIDI sequencers =====
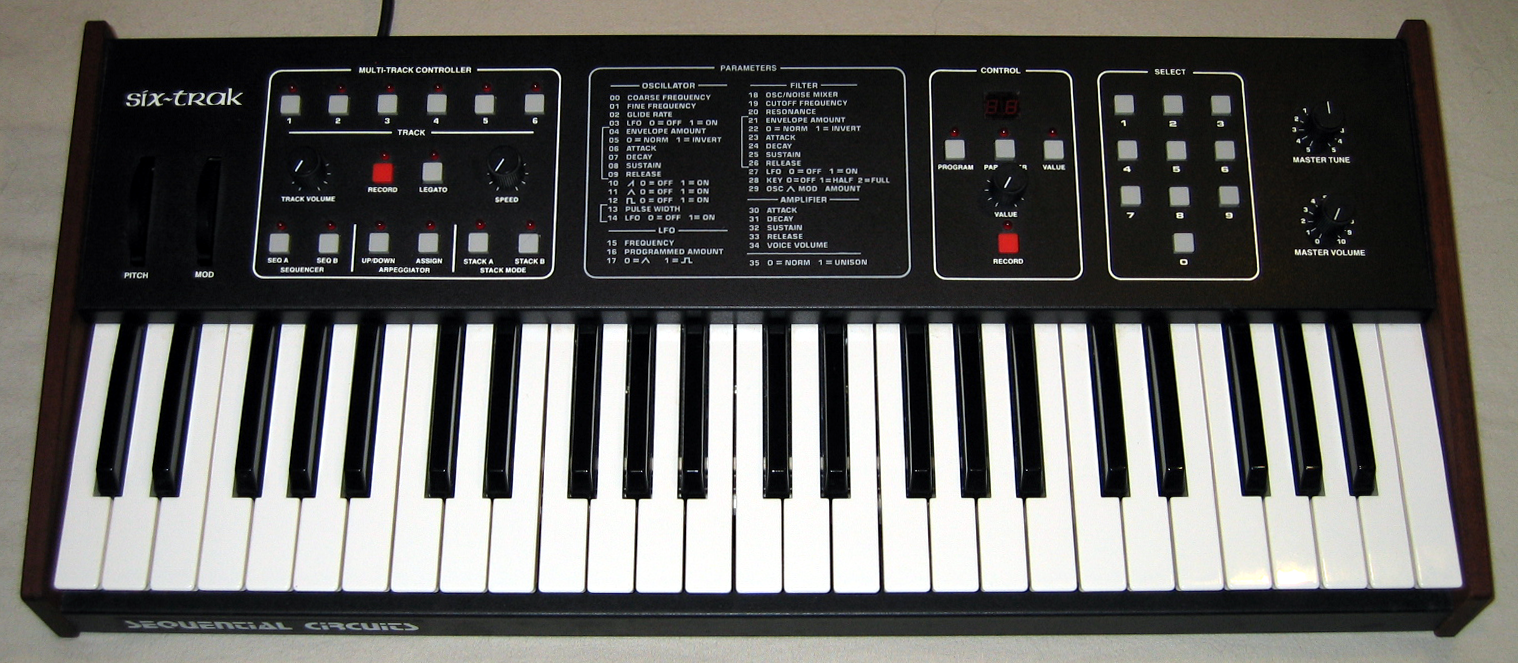
Sequential Circuits Six-Trak has embedded realtime MIDI sequencer.

- Sequential Circuits Six-Track (1984), MultiTrak (1985), Split-8 / Pro-8 (1985)

===== MIDI sequencers with embedded sound module =====
- Yamaha TQ5—desktop version of EOS YS200 FM workstation
- Yamaha QY10—with embedded GM tone generator (1990)
- Yamaha QY20—with embedded GM tone generator (1992)
- Yamaha QY300—with embedded GM tone generator (1994)
- Yamaha QY20—with embedded GM tone generator (1995)
- Yamaha QY700—with embedded XG tone generator (1996)
- Yamaha QY70—with embedded XG tone generator (1997)
- Yamaha QY100—with embedded XG tone generator (2000)

====== Palmtop MIDI sequencers ======
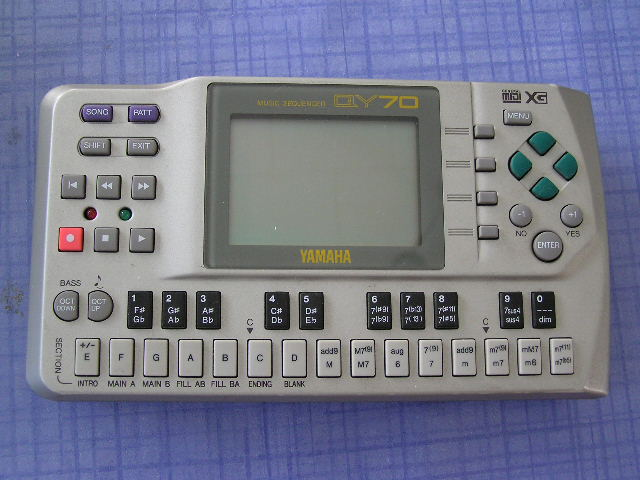
Yamaha QY70

- Korg SQ-8—palmtop sequencer
- Philips Micro Composer PMC100
- Roland PMA-5—palmtop sequencer with touch screen
- Yamaha Walkstation series: QY8/QY10/QY20/QY22/QY70/QY100—palmtop sequencer with embedded sound module

====== Accompaniment machines ======
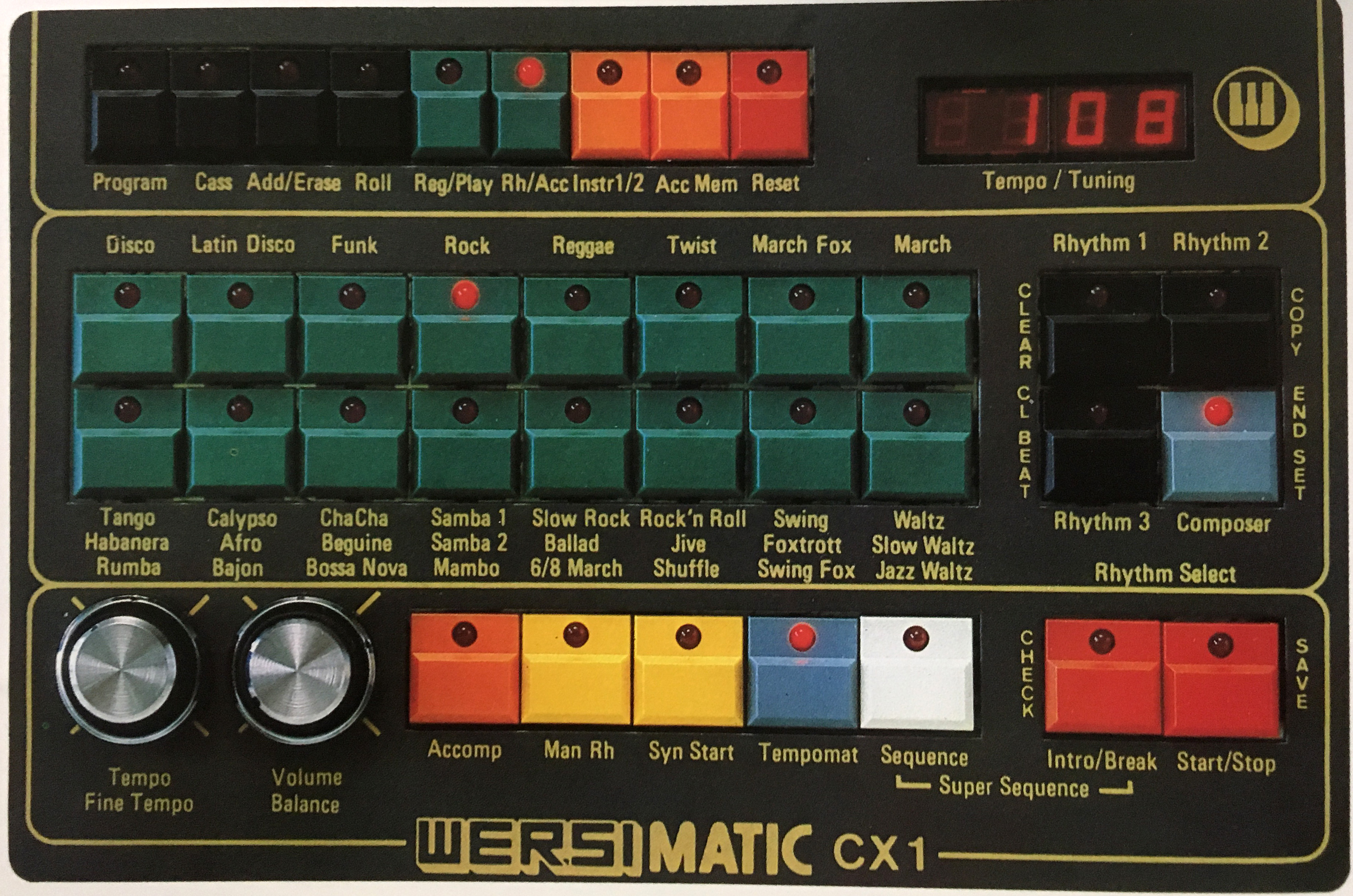
Wersi Wersimatic CX1

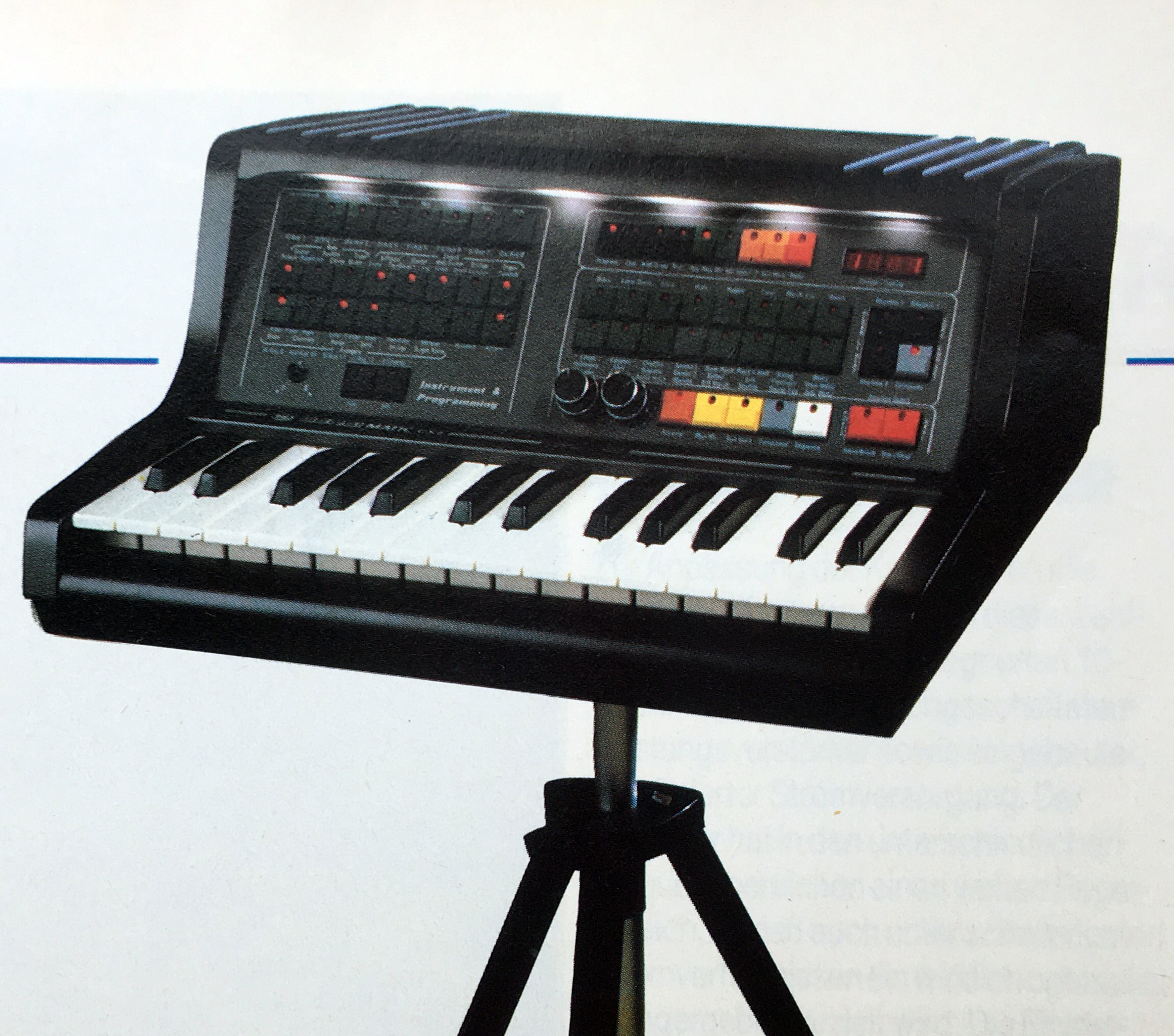
Wersimatic CX2

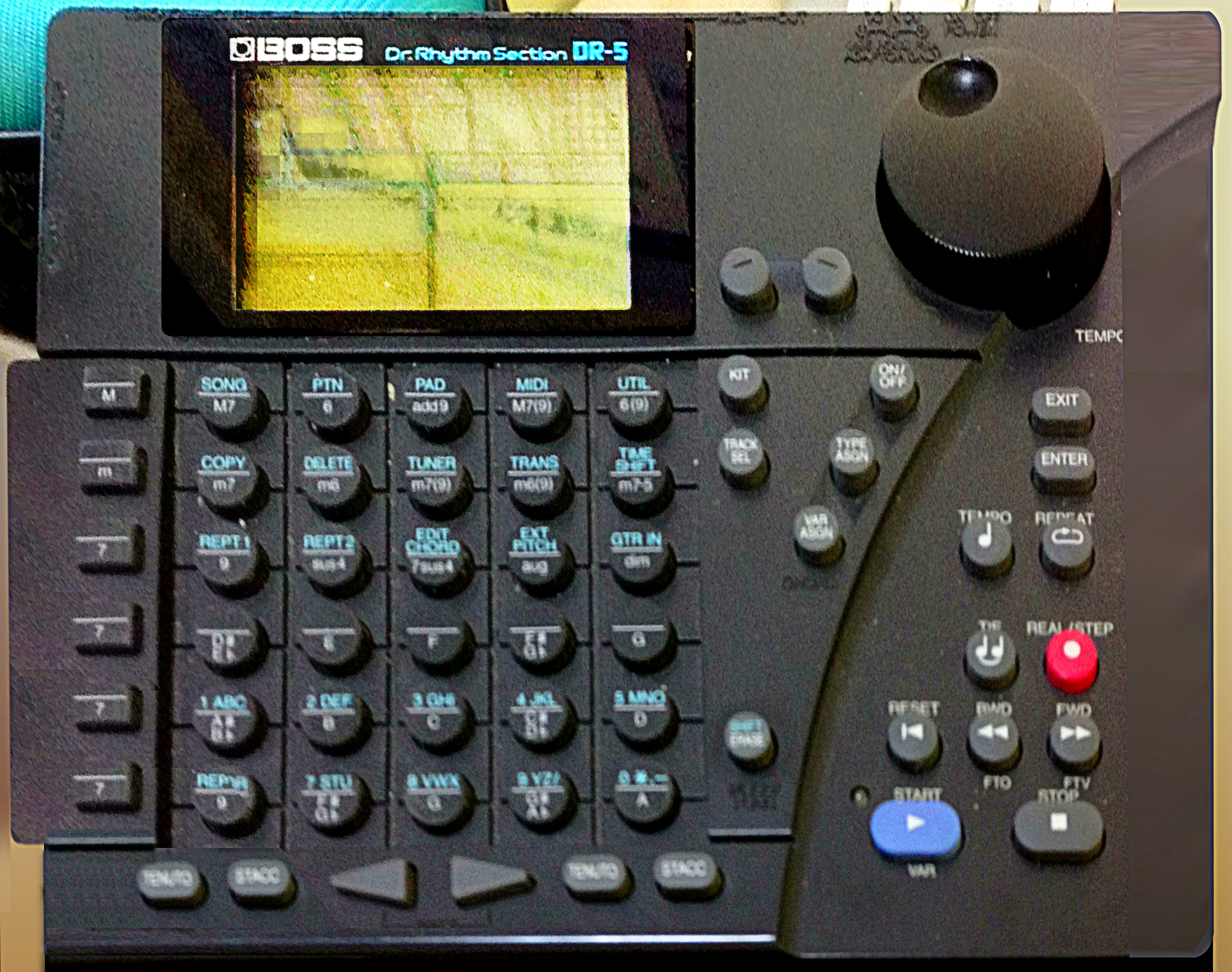
Boss DR-5

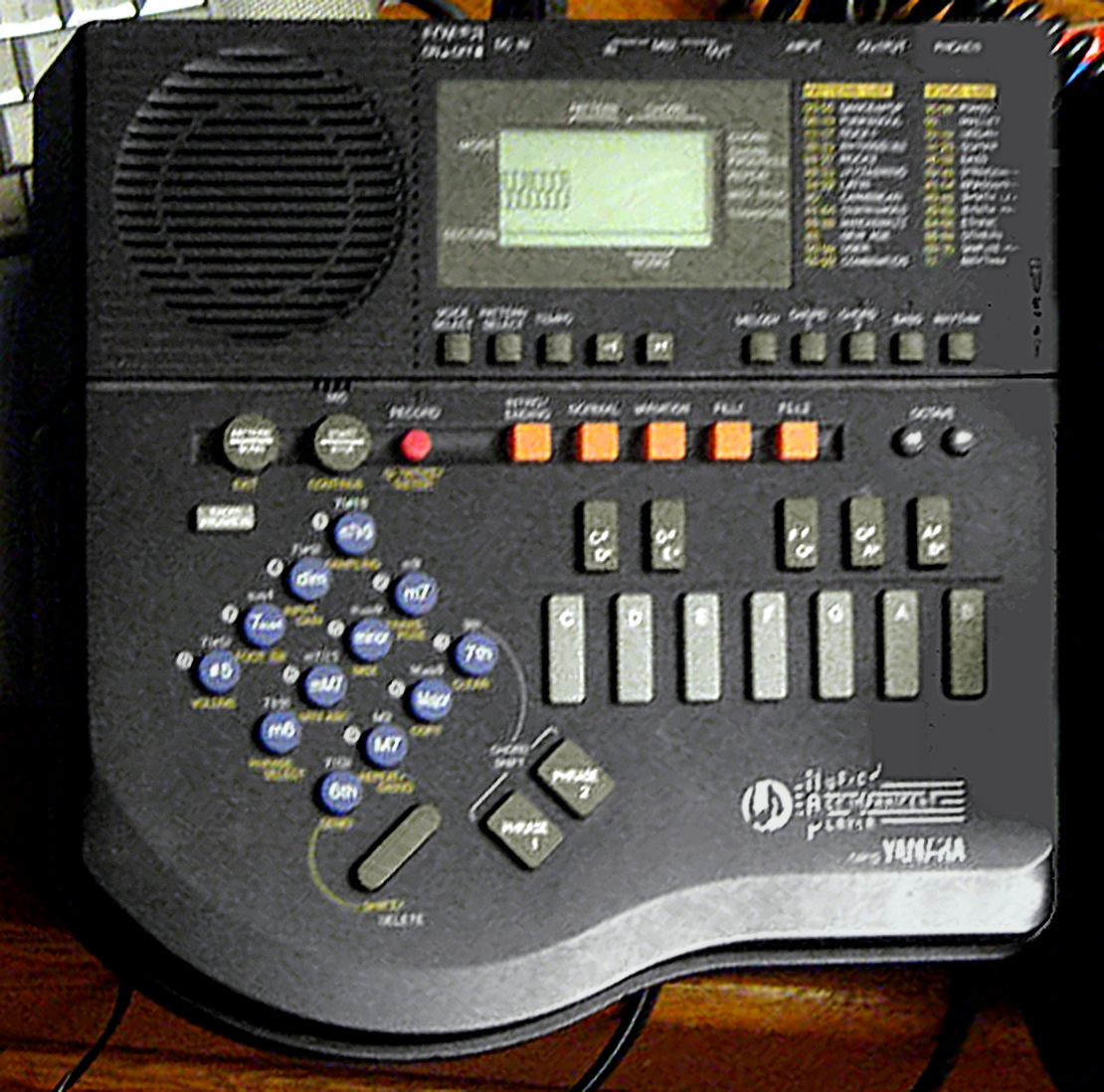
Yamaha QR10

- Boss DR-5 Dr.Rhythm Section
- Yamaha QR10 Musical Accompaniment Player

==== Open-source hardware ====
- MIDIbox Sequencer modules—Analog-style MIDI step sequencer/MIDI effect processor modules of MIDIbox project
- oTTo Sampler, Sequencer, Multi-engine synth and effects - in a box.

== Software sequencers and DAWs with sequencing features ==
=== Free, open source ===
==== Scorewriters ====
- MuseScore—Linux, Windows, OS X

==== DAW with MIDI sequencers ====
- Ardour—Linux, OS X, FreeBSD, Windows
- LMMS—Linux, Windows
- MusE—Linux
- Qtractor—Linux
- Rosegarden—Linux
- Auxy: Beat Studio—iOS 7

==== Drum machines ====
- Hydrogen—Linux, OS X

=== Commercial ===
==== Scorewriters ====
- Aegis Sonix—Amiga

==== Software MIDI sequencers ====
- B-Step Sequencer from Monoplugs
- Fugue Machine from Alexandernaut
- Master Tracks Pro from Passport Music Software
- Bars & Pipes Professional from Blue Ribbon Software [improved

by Alfred Faust] at http://bnp.hansfaust.de/indexeng.html

==== Loop-oriented DAWs with MIDI sequencers ====
- ACID Pro and Cinescore from Sony Creative Software
- Live from Ableton
- GarageBand from Apple
- REAPER from Cockos
- Tracktion from Mackie

==== Tracker-oriented DAWs with MIDI sequencers ====
- Renoise

==== DAWs with MIDI sequencers ====
- Ableton Live from Ableton
- Audition from Adobe (removed since Version 4 CS5.5)
- Bitwig Studio from Bitwig
- Cubase and Nuendo from Steinberg
- Digital Performer from MOTU
- REAPER from Cockos
- FL Studio from Image Line Software
- Logic Pro and Logic Express from Apple
- Mixcraft from Acoustica
- Mixbus from Harrison
- MuLab from MUTools
- MultitrackStudio from Bremmers Audio Design
- n-Track Studio from n-Track Software
- Pro Tools from Avid
- Samplitude, Sequoia, Music Maker and Music Studio from Magix
- Sonar, Music Creator and Home Studio from Cakewalk
- Studio One from PreSonus
- Z-Maestro from Z-Systems

==== Integrated software studio environments ====
- Reason and Record from Propellerhead
- Storm from Arturia

== See also ==
- List of music software
