= Comparison of MIDI editors and sequencers =

Notable software MIDI editors and sequencers are listed in the following table.

Software	Platform	License	Developer	Editing interface	Notes
Aegis Sonix	Amiga	Proprietary	Aegis Development	Score, keyboard, and an instrument editor	Music sequencer and a score editor.
Anvil Studio	Windows	Freemium	Willow Software	Score, piano roll, tablature, event list	Full-featured MIDI editor & sequencer with staff, piano roll, percussion, event list, and audio editors.
Ardour	FreeBSD, Linux, macOS, Windows	GPL-2.0-or-later	Paul Davis, and The Ardour Community	Piano roll, event list	MIDI support began with version 3.
Aria Maestosa	Linux, macOS, Windows	GPL-2.0-or-later			MIDI sequencer/editor with score, keyboard, guitar, drum and controller views.
B-Step Sequencer	macOS, Windows, Linux, iOS (iPad), Android, Raspberry Pi	Proprietary	Monoplugs		A step sequencer to create arpeggios, chord progressions, basslines or percussions. Available as VST, Audio Units or standalone program.
Band-in-a-Box	macOS, Windows (also previously for Atari ST)	Proprietary	PG Music		Accompaniment sequencer with audio loops and more.
Cakewalk by BandLab	Windows	Proprietary	BandLab Technologies	Piano roll, event list	
Steinberg Cubase	macOS, Windows (also previously for Atari ST)	Proprietary	Steinberg	Score, piano roll, drum editor, event list	
Deluxe Music Construction Set	AmigaOS, macOS	Proprietary	Electronic Arts		
Digital Performer	macOS, Windows	Proprietary	Mark of the Unicorn (MOTU)		
DirectMusic Producer	Windows	Freeware	Microsoft		Part of DirectMusic SDK.
Finale	macOS, Windows	Proprietary	MakeMusic, Inc.	Score	Composition and sequencing program, with various versions, including freeware (version 2008 and earlier) "NotePad" version (with very limited features). Discontinued.
FL Studio	Windows, macOS, Android, iOS	Proprietary	Image-Line	Piano roll, step sequencer	
GarageBand	macOS, iOS	Proprietary	Apple		Import only, saves to native format.
Guitar Pro	Linux, macOS, Windows	Proprietary	Arobas Music		
Indaba Music	macOS, Windows	Proprietary			
JFugue	Linux, macOS, Windows (Java-based)	5: Apache-2.0; 3-4: LGPL-2.1-or-later			Programming library (API).
KeyKit	Linux, Windows	Free for non-commercial use, source available			
LilyPond	FreeBSD, Linux, macOS, Windows	GPL-3.0-or-later			
Live	macOS, Windows	Proprietary	Ableton	Piano roll	
Logic Pro	macOS (also previously for Windows & Atari ST)	Proprietary	Apple/Emagic (formerly named C-Lab)	Piano roll, step editor, event list	
LMMS	Linux, macOS, OpenBSD, Windows	GPL-2.0-or-later		Piano roll, step sequencer	DAW; VST, LADSPA support. MIDI editor displaying notes positions on a virtual keyboard. As of March 30, 2011 no MIDI aftertouch support.
MAGIX Samplitude	Windows	Proprietary	MAGIX		
Master Tracks Pro	Windows	Proprietary	GVOX (originally Passport Designs)		Full-featured GUI MIDI sequencer with notation screen (requires supplied Anastasia TrueType or Type1 font), event editor, MCI, SMPTE sync., etc. Tested to work under Win 10 1903.
MIDI Converter Studio	Windows	Shareware	ManiacTools		MIDI file converter, karaoke converter.
MidiEditor	Linux, Windows	GPL-2.0-or-later	Markus Schwenk	Piano roll	Open-sourced on GitHub.
Mixcraft	Windows	Proprietary	Acoustica		Audio and MIDI sequencer, support for VSTis, MIDI recording, editing, and playback.
Mozart	Windows	Proprietary	David Webber		Music notation software for simple tunes to full scores of up to 64 parts.
MuLab	Windows, macOS	Proprietary	Mutools		MIDI and audio full DAW. Support for customizable modular DSP graphs. For electronic music, but not only.
MultitrackStudio	Windows, macOS, iOS	Proprietary	Bremmers Audio Design		MIDI and audio full DAW, simple user interface, flexible MIDI editing.
MusE	Linux	GPL-2.0-or-later		Piano roll, event list	Open source midi and audio work station with support for VST, DSSI, LADSPA and LV2.
MuseScore	Linux, macOS, Windows, iOS (partial)	GPL-2.0-only	Werner Schweer	Score	Music notation software with full MusicXML support. Piano roll editor, unlimited parts. good stability below 300 000 notes, edit multiple files at once, user friendly GUI, portable edition.
Musink	Windows	Proprietary	Lee Reid		Music notation freeware with MIDI output, loop, and playback functionality.
Notation Composer	Windows, with Wine support	Proprietary	Notation Software	Score, piano roll	Full featured notation software program and MIDI sequencer.
NoteEdit	Linux	GPL-2.0-or-later	Jörg Anders	MIDI based score writer	Defunct; last stable release September 2006.
NoteWorthy Composer	Windows	Proprietary	Noteworthy Software		Can import and export MIDI data, but only edit and display it as a musical score. Runs correctly in Wine.
Overture	macOS, Windows	Proprietary	Sonic Scores (formerly called Geniesoft)	Score, piano roll, MIDI sequencer	Notation, tab, piano roll, MIDI/step sequencing, VST/VSTi host, hybrid DAW, video sync.
Pagan	Android	GPL-3.0-or-later	Quintin F Smith	Base 12 variable size step sequencer	
Pro Tools	macOS, Windows	Proprietary	Avid	Score, piano roll, event list	
Qtractor	Linux	GPL-2.0-or-later			Audio MIDI multi-track sequencer application written in C++ in the Qt framework.
REAPER	Linux, macOS, Windows	Proprietary	Cockos	Score, piano roll, event list	Supports guitar tabs and MIDI2Tab conversion with TabEditor plug.
Reason	macOS, Windows	Proprietary	Propellerhead	Piano roll	
Renoise	Linux, macOS, Windows	Proprietary		Tracker	Demo version available.
Rosegarden	Linux	GPL-2.0-or-later		Score, piano roll, event list	Audio, MIDI sequence, record. Win VST support, LADSPA, JACK.
Scala	Linux, macOS, Windows	Freeware, noncommercial	Manuel Op de Coul		Specializes in tuning; converts ascii score file to MIDI.
Seq24	Linux, Windows	GPL-2.0-or-later		Piano roll	MIDI loops sequencer.
Sibelius	macOS, Windows	Proprietary	Avid (originally Sibelius Software)	Score, piano roll, tablature	Live scoring of sheet music from MIDI input.
Signal	Web	Open source	Signal	Piano roll, event list	
Studio One	macOS, Windows	Proprietary	PreSonus	Score, piano roll, drum editor	
TineFune	Linux, Windows	Proprietary	TineFune, LLC	Piano roll, event list	MIDI sequencer with a Web Browser GUI, no windows or menu clutter.
TuxGuitar	FreeBSD, Linux, macOS, Windows (Java-based)	LGPL-2.1-only		Tablature	Tablature editor.
Z-Maestro	Windows	Proprietary			"Lite" version: limited tracks, I/O.

== See also ==
- List of scorewriters
- Comparison of free software for audio
- MIDI Show Control
- MIDI Show Control software
- List of music software
- Category:MIDI standards
