= Auxy =

Auxy is the name or part of the name of the following communes in France:

- Auxy, Loiret, in the Loiret department
- Auxy, Saône-et-Loire, in the Saône-et-Loire department
- Saint-Martin-d'Auxy, in the Saône-et-Loire department

It may also refer to:

- Auxy: Beat Studio, a music sequencer app for the Apple iPad
