= Hauptwerk =

Software simulating a pipe organ

- Developer: Milan Digital Audio
- Stable release: 9.0.1 / 2024 December 02; 17 months ago
- Operating system: Microsoft Windows, Mac OS X
- Website: hauptwerk.com

Hauptwerk is a computer program from Milan Digital Audio that allows the playback or live performance of pipe organ music using MIDI and recorded sound samples.

== Name ==
The name "Hauptwerk" is German for the "great manual" of an organ, from Haupt- (meaning ‘main’) and Werk (literally meaning ‘work’, but in this instance meaning a complete organ pipe cabinet and all its included ranks). The German pronunciation of "Hauptwerk" is [ˈhaʊ̯ptˌvɛʁk].

== History ==
Hauptwerk was originally developed and launched in 2002 by Martin Dyde, who, starting 2006, continued to develop it under Crumhorn Labs Ltd. In September 2008, Crumhorn Labs and Hauptwerk were acquired by Brett Milan of Milan Digital Audio LLC.

== Product history ==
Screen image of the organ of St Annes, Moseley.

=== Version 1 ===
Released 2002

- Available for Windows only
- Stops operated by MIDI Note messages
- Simple Swell simulation (volume only)
- Organ of St Annes, Moseley included

=== Version 2 ===
Released 2006

- Available as VSTi plugin
- More flexibility in MIDI configuration
- Phase alignment of release samples
- Harmonic Swell simulation

=== Version 3 ===
Released November 2007

- Support for Mac OS X
- Support for Multiple Touch-Screens
- Voicing Control for individual pipes

=== Version 4 ===
Released April 2011

- Redesigned User Interface
- Automatic facility to configure MIDI to support most manufacturers
- Inbuilt MIDI recorder/player
- User defined Combinations/Crescendos
- Master Couplers available with all organs

=== Version 5 ===
Released December 2019

- Redesigned Audio Output Routing
- 3D Sound output
- Impulse Response reverb capabilities
- Removed Free Edition

=== Version 6 ===
Released November 2020

- Menu changes
- Combination system changes
- MIDI changes
- Audio engine changes
- Small changes + bug fixes

=== Version 7 ===
Released February 2022

=== Version 8 ===
Released August 2023

=== Version 9 ===
Released November 2024

== Method ==
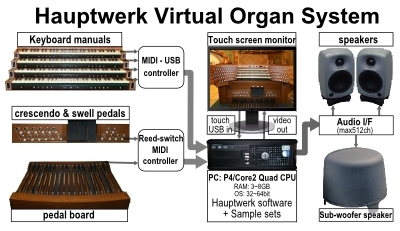

Hauptwerk produces an audio signal in response to input received via the manual MIDI keyboard. This input may originate from an external MIDI keyboard or from a MIDI sequencing program. An organ is constructed using a set of recorded sample files in conjunction with an XML configuration file that defines organ parameters, such as ranks, stops, manuals, coupling and organ images for display in Hauptwerk's user interface.

The audio output is based on recorded samples which are then modified by several different technologies.

=== Sample playback ===
The recorded samples of the original pipes are divided into three main sections: start (attack), middle (sustain), and end (release or echo). When a note is played, the attack sample is played, followed by a loop of the sustain section. Start, end, and release loop points are stored in the recorded sample file. When the note is released, the release or echo section of the sample is used, or specific release sample files can be defined for a note or range of notes. This latter feature is useful in making the organ more realistic. For example, the echo of a pipe after a short period differs from that of a pipe that has been sounding for longer. Hauptwerk selects from multiple release samples based on the duration of the note. Tremulant effects are possible using LFO sample files to dynamically modify the sound, avoiding the need to create individual tremulant note sample files, however, some sample sets still have separately recorded Tremulant stops..

=== Harmonic filtering ===
An organist moving an expression pedal affects both the volume and frequency envelope of the affected pipes. Hauptwerk adjusts both of these parameters using information provided within the sample-set. This adjustment is based on measurements taken from the original instrument.

=== Physical modeling ===
The wind pressure of an organ pipe affects its volume, pitch, and character. Hauptwerk uses fluid dynamics to model the movement of air through the various parts of a pipe-organ. This information is then used to modify the sampled sound.

=== Randomization ===
Randomization is used to modify certain aspects of the audio output. The pitch of individual pipes can be randomly modified when a sample is loaded into memory. If multiple loop points are provided, in the sustain section of a sample, these are selected randomly. Additionally, Hauptwerk simulates some other effects, such as wind turbulence, using randomization during playback.

== Organ sample-sets ==
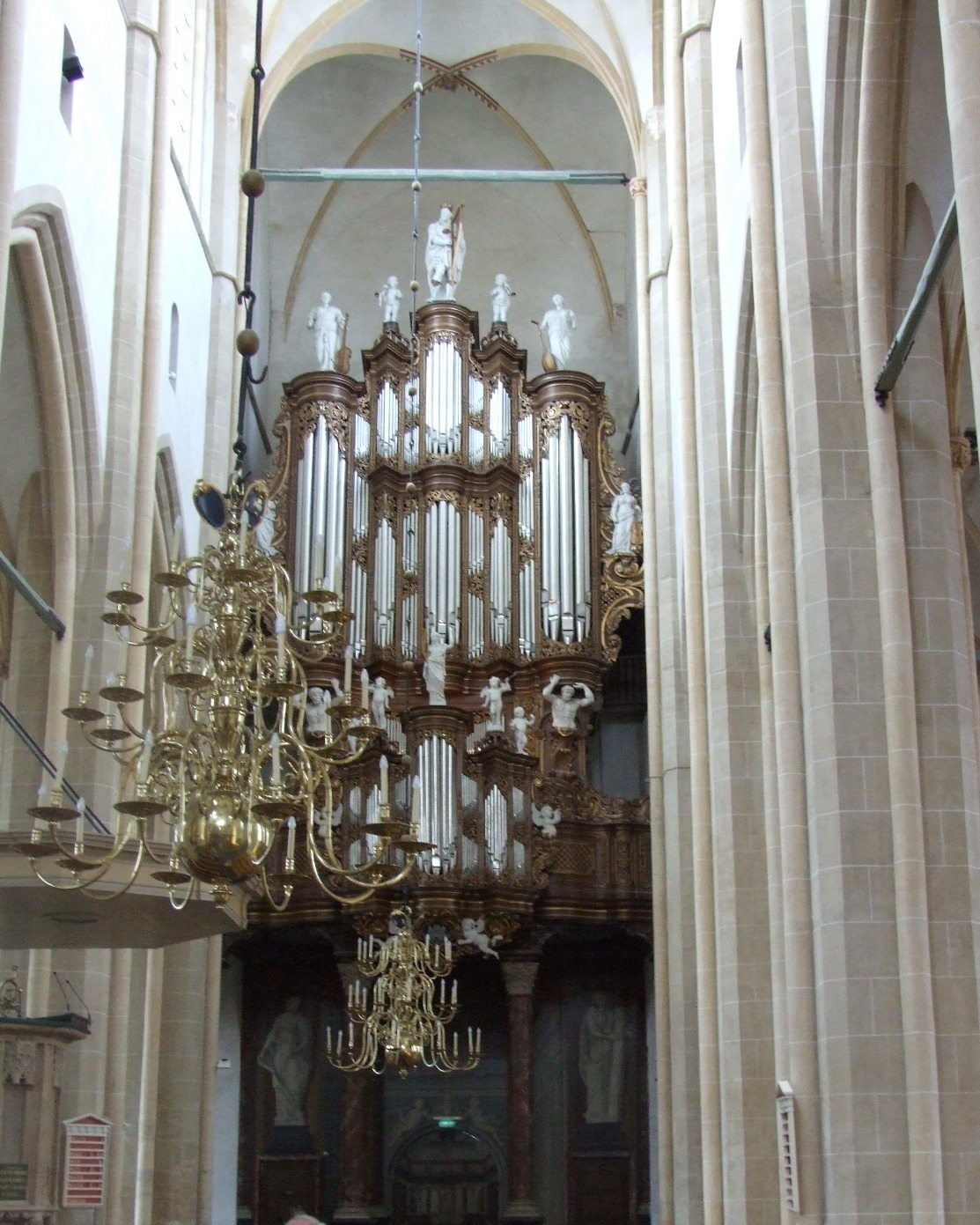
One of the organs that has been recorded for use with Hauptwerk (Bovenkerk, Kampen)

Since the launch of Hauptwerk, a number of independent companies have recorded organs and made these available for use with Hauptwerk. By March 2009 more than 50 organs had been recorded. These include some notable organs in many different countries including:

- St Ann's Moseley, UK. This sample set comes installed with Hauptwerk.
- Bavokerk, Haarlem, Netherlands
- Bovenkerk, Kampen, Netherlands
- Eglise de Saint Etienne, Caen, France
- Laurenskerk, Rotterdam, Netherlands
- Palace of Arts (Budapest), Hungary
- Salisbury Cathedral, UK
- Stadtkirche, Waltershausen, Germany
- Martinikerk, Groningen, Netherlands
- Melbourne Town Hall, Australia
- Hereford Cathedral, UK
- Notre Dame de Metz, France

=== Use of Hauptwerk in Salisbury Cathedral ===
In March 2009, Milan Digital Audio announced that permission had been granted to record the Father Willis organ at Salisbury Cathedral, UK.

Beginning February 23, 2010, the Salisbury Cathedral pipe organ was temporarily unavailable, because of maintenance work scheduled to last one month. During this time, a console based on Hauptwerk was used to provide organ music for cathedral services.

According to an article on the Salisbury Cathedral website: "Over the past few weeks we have used the organs from Metz Cathedral, France, St Georgenkirche, Roetha, Germany, and Our Lady of Mt. Carmel, Chicago, IL., USA". The article continues: "Volume I of our very own Father Willis Organ was released by Milan Digital Audio just days before the organ was installed into the cathedral which has allowed me to use 28 of the 65 stops of the Father Willis organ in its natural acoustic. It is believed to be the first time a sampled instrument has been used in its own building for services!"

== Composite Sample Sets ==
The custom organ design module allows Hauptwerk users to create custom organs by mixing the recordings of one or more existing sample sets to create a custom organ or use their own recordings. One can select certain ranks from one organ and from another and combine them to create a personal and unique organ, while also adding enhanced features and voicing which the original sample sets do not offer. Examples include:

- Aristide no. 1 (Hauptwerk-organ.com)
- Grand Symphonic Composite
- Composite of Saint Sulpitius (Organa Reginae Caeli)
- Composite of Our Lady of Paris (Organa Reginae Caeli)

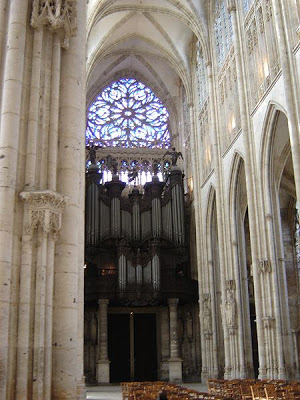
The St Ouen organ has sprouted many composites that are based on it, the most known being Aristide no. 1

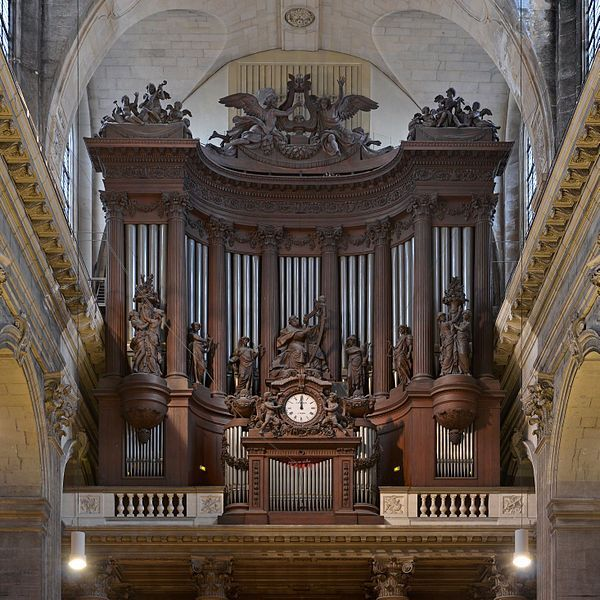
One of the organs that have been modeled by Organa Reginae Caeli, using similar sample sets.

== Copy protection older versions and iLok ==
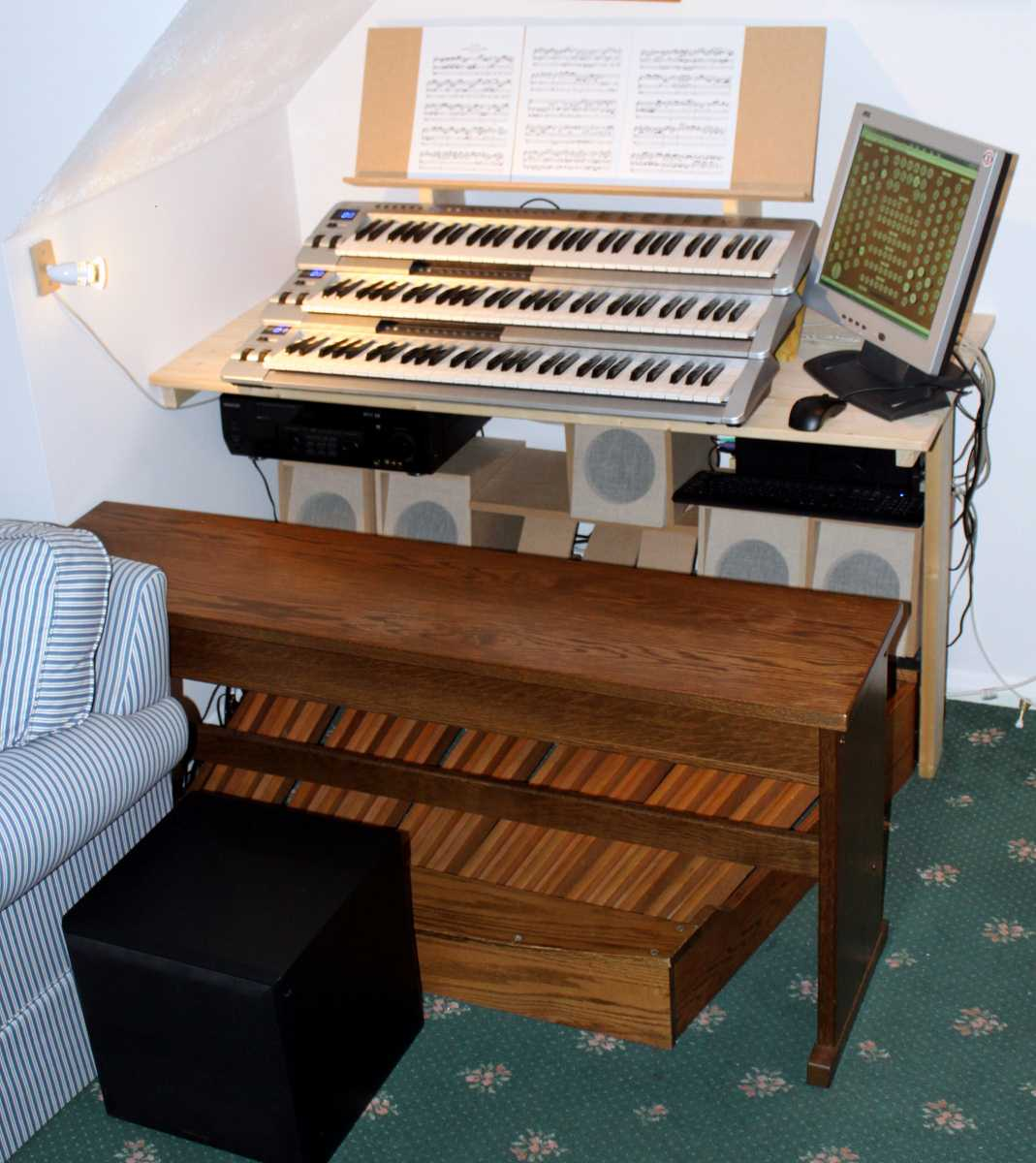
A simple Hauptwerk setup in a domestic setting

Hauptwerk was copy protected using the HASP USB token (dongle) from Aladdin Knowledge Systems.

The USB token was used to control the functionality of the single Hauptwerk program which was licensed in three editions:

- Free edition – Free download and use without USB token but limited to 1.5GB sample memory and 256 polyphony, stereo output.
- Basic edition – Purchased license with USB token. Up to 3GB sample memory and 1024 polyphony
- Advanced edition – Purchased license with USB token. No imposed memory or polyphony limit, multiple audio channels and MIDI output.

The USB token was also used by some companies to enforce license conditions of individual sample sets. This may apply to the release of historic recordings with restrictions on the customization and re-use of the sounds.

Since the release of Hauptwerk version 5, Hauptwerk has used the licensing platform iLok by Pace Anti Piracy. There are now only two editions:

- Lite – Subscription license, limited to 1024 polyphony, other limitations apply.
- Advanced – Subscription or Perpetual license.

== See also ==
- Pipe organ
- Electronic organ
- List of MIDI editors and sequencers
- MIDI usage and applications
- List of music software
