= Josef Anton Riedl =

German composer

Josef Anton Riedl (11 June 1929 – 25 March 2016) was a German composer.

== Biography ==
Riedl was born in Munich in 1929 (1927 is also given as his year of birth). Following a period of studies at the Hochschule für Musik und Theater München and in courses given by Hermann Scherchen in Gravesano, Riedl, influenced by Carl Orff and Edgar Varèse, devoted himself as a composer particularly to percussion and Lautgedichte (sound poetry).

In 1950 he was co-founder of the German Section of the Jeunesses Musicales, together with Herbert Barth, Reiner Bredemeyer and Eckhart Rolfs. Starting in 1952 he did pioneering work in the use of concrete and electronic sounds, joining Pierre Schaefer’s Groupe de Recherche Musicale in 1953. In 1955 he worked in the electronic studio of NWDR in Cologne, and spent some time in 1959 in Scherchen’s experimental studio in Gravesano. From 1959 until its closure in 1966 Riedl was director of the Siemens Studio for electronic music. The concert series Neue Musik München / Klang-Aktionen initiated by Riedl in 1960 continues to this day. In 1967 he established the Musik/Film/Dia/Licht-Galerie group, and in 1974 in Bonn founded the Kultur Forum, which he directed until 1982.

As a teacher Riedl influenced the work of musicians well-known today, such as Lorenzo Ferrero and Michael Lentz, for whose Bachmann Prize–winning book Muttersterben (2001) he created the music. Since 1989, Lentz performs as saxophonist in Riedl's ensemble.

Riedl also contributed to film music, for example to several episodes of the 13-part Die zweite Heimat—Chronik einer Jugend (1992), the second in Edgar Reitz's Heimat series He died in Murnau am Staffelsee on 25 March 2016.
