= Siemens Synthesizer =

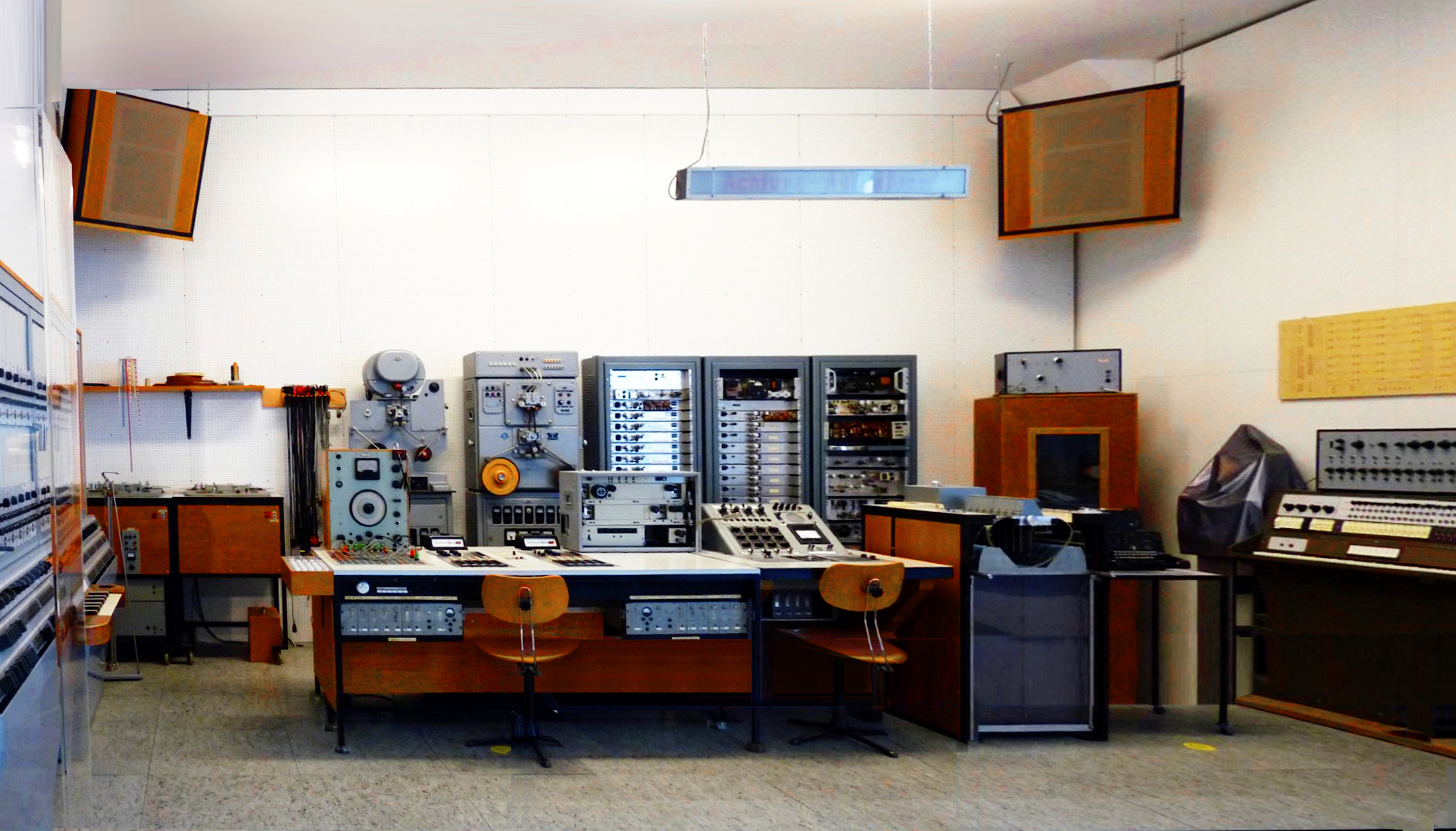
The Siemens Synthesizer (c. 1959) as seen in the Deutsches Museum in Munich (Germany)

The Siemens Synthesizer (or "Siemens Studio für Elektronische Musik") was developed in Germany in 1959 by the German electronics manufacturer Siemens, originally to compose live electronic music for its own promotional films.

From 1956 to 1967, it had a significant influence on the development of electronic music. Among others, Mauricio Kagel, Henri Pousseur, Herbert Brün and Ernst Krenek completed important electronic works there.

== History ==
In 1955, Siemens established an audio laboratory, the Siemens Studio für Elektronische Musik, in its Munich facilities to produce electronic music for its publicity films. Siemens engineers Helmut Klein and Alexander Schaaf were charged with assembling the components for the studio and providing a means for controlling the composition, synthesis, and recording of music. The organization of the studio was completed by 1959. A second model was installed in 1964.

The studio was closed in 1967 but its main control room and equipment have been preserved as part of a museum exhibit at the Deutsches Museum in Munich.

From 1959 until its closure, Josef Anton Riedl was director of the studio.

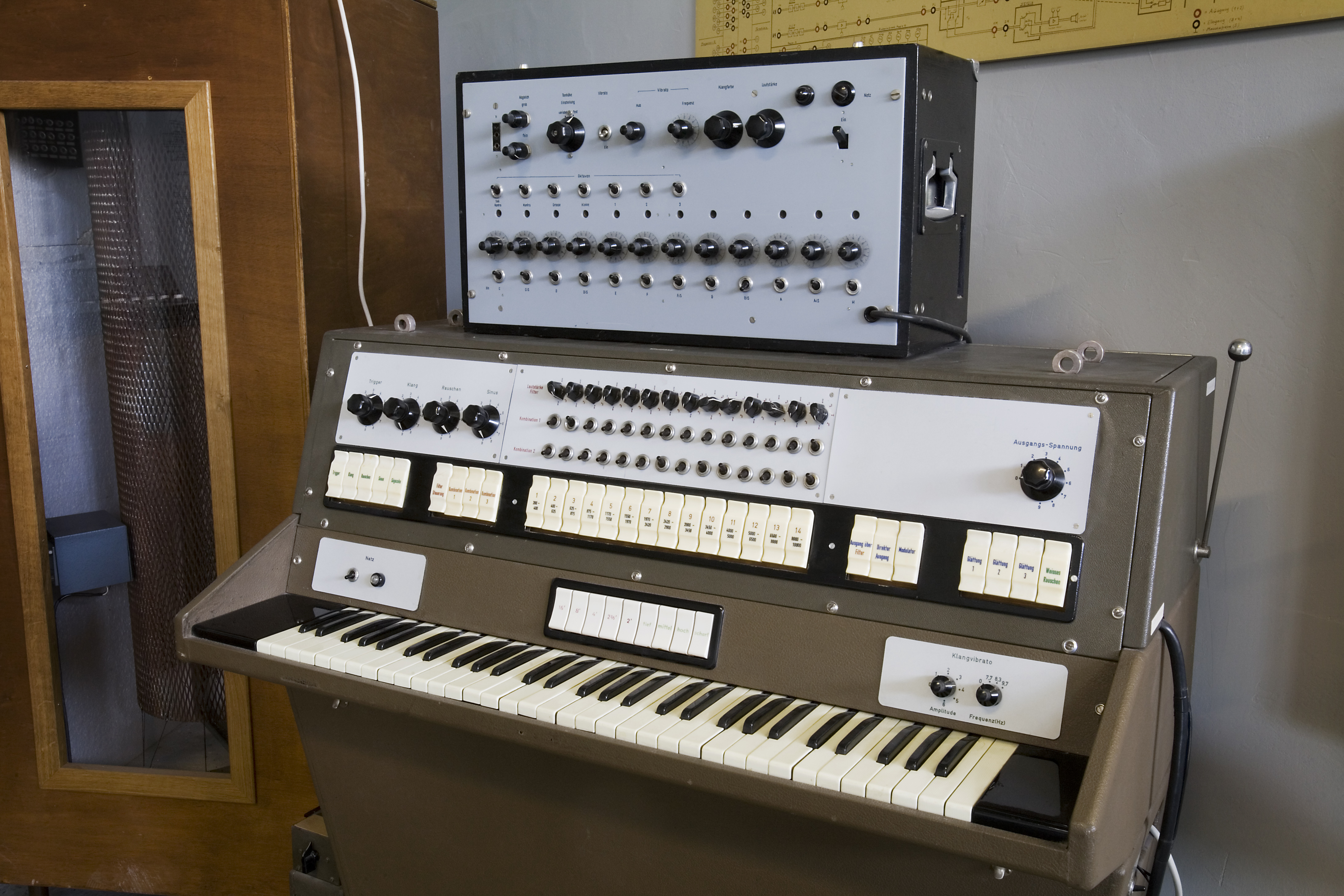
Modified Hohner Hohnerola - hybrid electronically-amplified electrically-blown reed organ

== Technology ==
The Siemens Synthesizer was controlled by a set of four punch paper rolls controlling the timbre, envelope, pitch and volume. Equipment found in the studio included a bank of 20 oscillators, a white noise generator, a Hohnerola (a hybrid electronically amplified reed instrument marketed by Hohner) and an impulse generator. The synthesizer had a tonal range of seven octaves.

The Siemens Synthesizer offered a method for controlling its tone-generating facilities, modification and modulation of the sounds in real time, and the manipulation of recorded material into finished works.

== Uses ==
Between 1960 and 1966, the studio opened its doors to many outside composers, including:

- Bengt Hambraeus
- Bruno Maderna
- Ernst Krenek
- Henri Pousseur
- Herbert Brün
- Iannis Xenakis
- Josef Anton Riedl
- Karlheinz Stockhausen
- Mauricio Kagel
- Milko Kelemen
- Niccolo Castiglioni
- Pierre Boulez

== Gallery ==
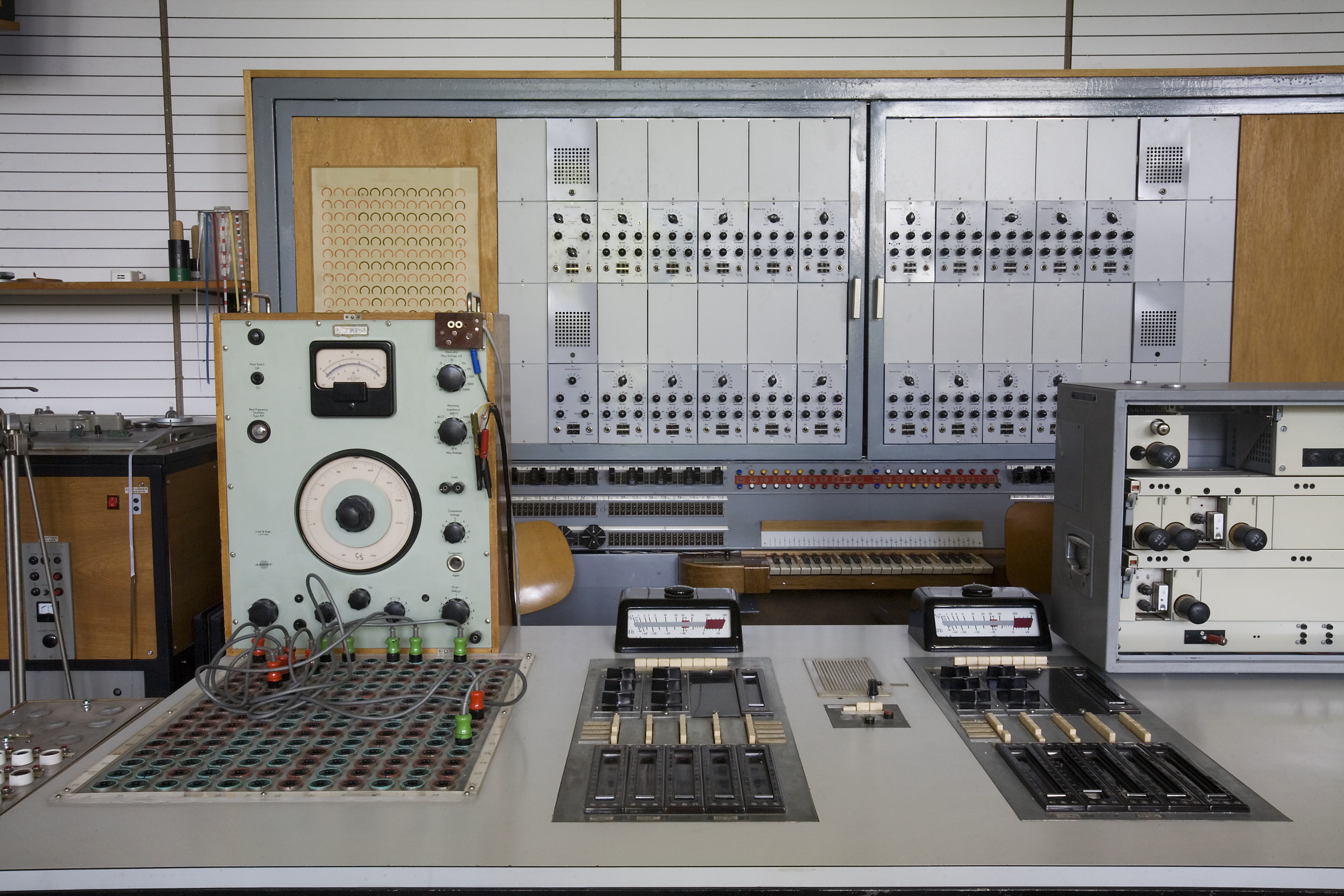
The mixer with a noise generator on the left and the frequency converter on the right. Behind it, a wall of 20 sine wave generators.

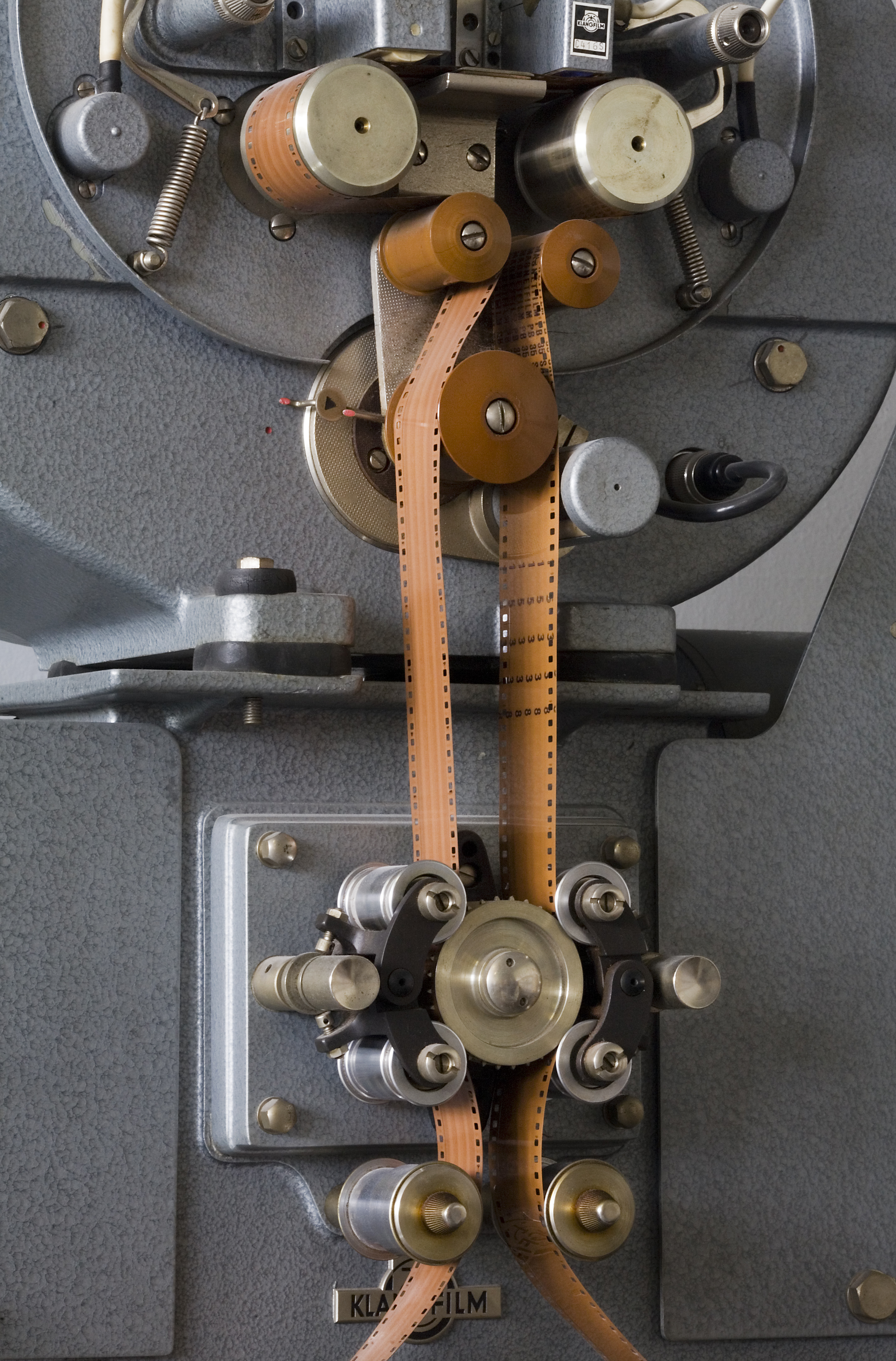
A synchronous-motor moves the paper strips across the reader.

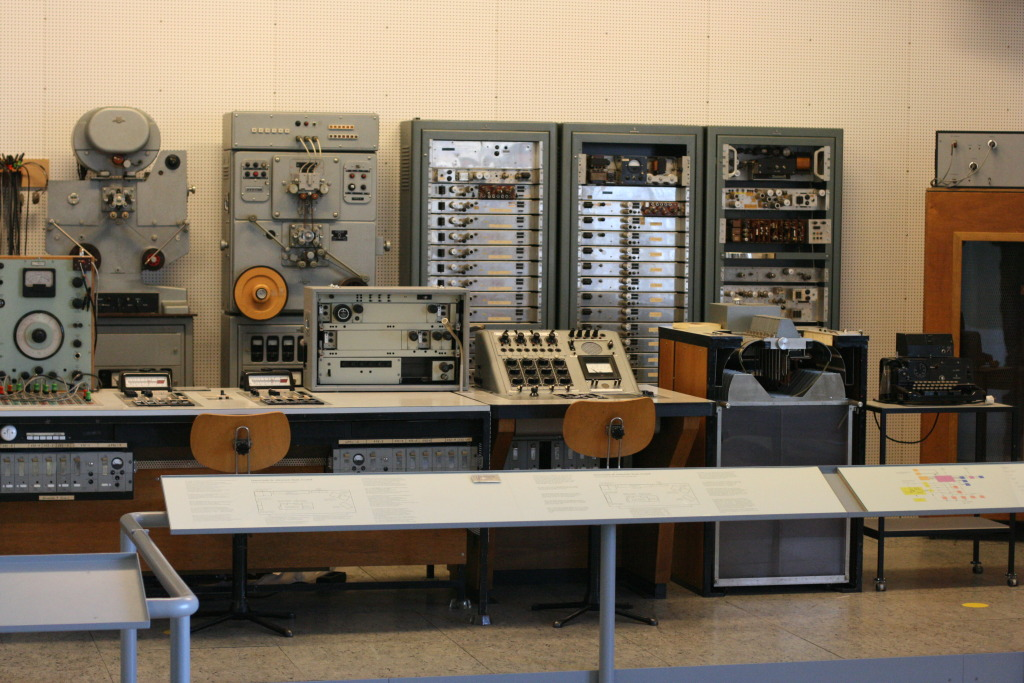
The studio equipments of the Siemens Studio für Elektronische Musik, referred as "Simens synthesizer".

== See also ==
- Electronic musical instrument
- List of music sequencers
- List of vocoders
- Music sequencer
- Recording studio
- Studio monitor
- Vocoder

== Bibliography ==
- Stefan Schenk: Das Siemens-Studio für elektronische Musik. In: Münchner Veröffentlichungen zur Musikgeschichte, Band 72. Hans Schneider Verlag 2014, a revised version of the dissertation at the Ludwig-Maximilians-Universität München, Munich 2016, ISBN 978-3-86296-064-4. (Online)
- Wolf Loeckle: «Was gibt’s Neues?» Josel Anton Riedl, das Elektronische Siemens-Studio, die Natur. In: Neue Zeitschrift für Musik, Ausgabe 2014/2, S. 24–27.
- Helmut Klein: Klangsynthese und Klanganalyse im elektronischen Studio. In: Frequenz – Journal for RF, Band 16/1962 Nr. 3, S. 109–114
- Siemens Kulturprogramm (Hrsg.): Siemens-Studio für elektronische Musik. Munich 1994
- Siemens Kulturprogramm: Siemens-Studio für elektronische Musik. audiocom multimedia, 1998 (CD mit Kompositionen aus dem Studio)
