= Anvil Studio =

Digital audio workstation

- Developer(s): Willow Software
- Initial release: October 10, 1998
- Stable release: 2024.08.01 / August 1, 2024; 12 months ago
- Written in: C++
- Operating system: Microsoft Windows
- Size: 3.5 MB
- Available in: English
- Type: Digital audio workstation
- License: Freemium
- Website: www.anvilstudio.com

Anvil Studio is a multitrack MIDI and audio editing, digital audio workstation program that runs on Microsoft Windows. It is developed by Willow Software, based in Shoreline, Washington, U.S.A.

== Software overview ==
Anvil Studio consists of a free core program with optional add-ons. The free version is a fully functional MIDI editor/sequencer which loads and saves standard MIDI-formatted files, and allows individual tracks to be edited with a:

- Staff editor,
- Piano Roll editor,
- Percussion editor,
- TAB editor, or
- MIDI event list editor.

The program uses the standard MIDI Sequencer-Specific event (FF 7F) to control items not specifically defined by the MIDI standard, such as:

- the font to use when rendering lyrics,
- the position of notes or staff notation,
- links to Pulse-code modulation formatted audio files for audio tracks.

By default, Anvil Studio uses a General MIDI software synthesizer for playback, but also allows tracks to be assigned to VST instrument or external MIDI devices. It processes audio using Core Audio, ASIO, DirectX or WDM or enabled drivers.

== System requirements ==
Anvil Studio runs on Microsoft Windows XP/Vista/7/8/10/11 (32-bit or 64-bit versions).

== Anvil Studio's use in Education ==
Anvil Studio is used in University research, is included in the curriculum for college classes in music creation and video game design., and is recommended by the book 'The Game Makers Apprentice' for use in the creation of video games.

Anvil Studio is recommended by librarians for displaying sheet music for widely available free classical music files. It is used in library-hosted computer clubs for promoting 21st century literacy skills.

Anvil Studio is recommended by 'Recorder Classroom Magazine' for use in elementary education. and by the U.K Choral Society as an aid for learning timing and pitch.
