= Roland OP-8 =

The Roland OP-8 interface was designed to control Roland polyphonic synthesizers that were equipped with a DCB (Digital Control Bus) interface via the Roland MC-4 Microcomposer. The OP-8 and synthesizer were connected together using a DCB cable. The OP-8 and MC-4 Microcomposer were then patched together using patchcords via each of their patchbays. The transpose control on the OP-8 was able to transpose the synthesizer up or down by one octave.

== DCB Equipped Synthesizers ==
- Roland Jupiter 8

The Jupiter 8 needed minor changes in its circuit for setting up with the OP-8. This work was carried out by Roland.

- Roland Juno 60

When using the OP-8 with a Roland Juno 60 the connection and operation were extremely easy, as only the CV and gate input jacks, and the transpose switch were relevant.
