= Notron =

British-designed MIDI step sequencer

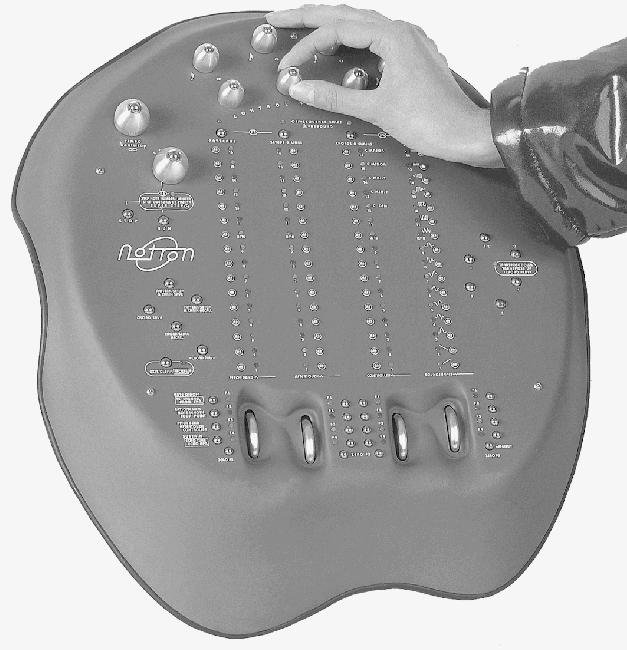
Notron Mark 1

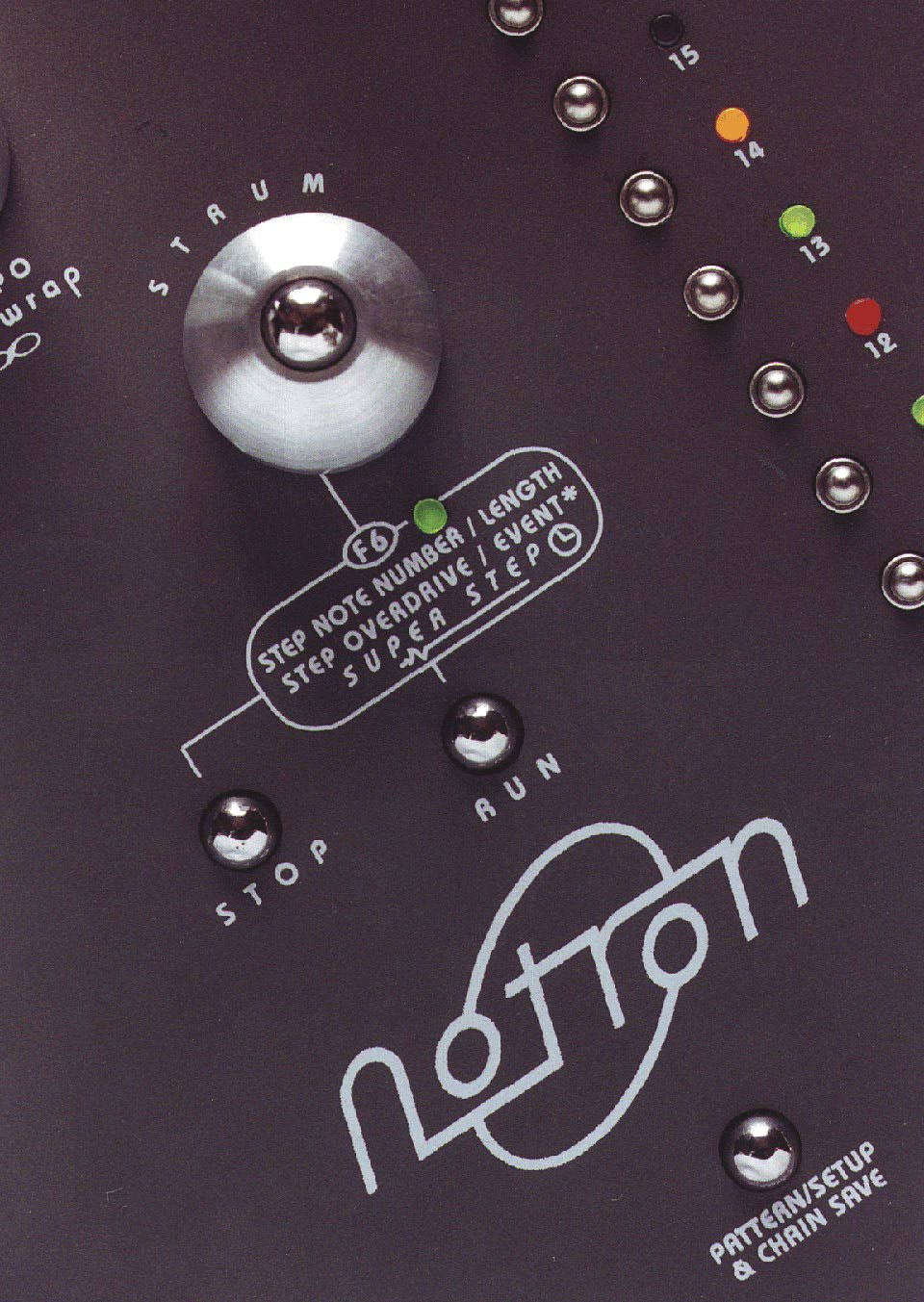
Notron Mark 1 detail

The Notron is a British-designed MIDI step sequencer used by Björk, Peter Gabriel, Howie B and others. Produced in two models, the Mark 1 was available between 1996 and 1998. The Mark 2 was a slim blue box produced until about 2001. About 100 Mark 1 units were sold and a similar amount of Mark 2s.The Notron was a step-time MIDI sequencer having four rows and up to 16 steps. It was made to be used as a lap-top device for ease in live performances. In 2006 the company released a software version of the Latronic Notron.

It was designed by and developed by Gerard Campbell and the software was written by Dave Spowage of Concourse Systems (UK). The original model bodywork was designed by Martyn Seiles. It was sold under the company name Latronic.

In 1999 the Notron won a Millennium Award from the Design Council and was exhibited at the Millennium Dome during 2000.
