= Composer-Tron =

The Composer-Tron was developed by Osmond Kendal for the Canadian Marconi Company in 1953.

It was the first analogue synthesis and composition instrument of its kind. It utilized a unique and innovative control system that had a cathode ray tube input device that could read shapes or patterns that was hand drawn on to its surface with a grease pencil. The drawn shape could define the timbre of the note, or the envelope shape of the sound. A sequence of the rhythmical markings could be defined using the writings similar to a cue sheet type strip of film.

This was the future innovation for composers. With Kendal's grease pencil, the composer could draw the grooves, run it through the Composer-Tron and can ensure that all written music was listened to first, before symphony orchestra's played the music. Before the Composer-Tron composers would have to wait years just to listen if their work was complete. Sometimes their best work was never heard by the composer himself.

This invention was one of the first major steps that combined the producing efforts of the RCA Synthesizer, by Harry Olsen and Hebert Belar with the Marconi Company of America.

== Further Information ==
"The Art Of Electronic Music", Darter, Tom. 1984 GPI Productions. (pp. 46_47)
