= Fugue Machine =

Music sequencer for iOS

- Original author(s): Alexandernaut
- Initial release: October 8, 2015; 9 years ago
- Stable release: 1.5.16 / October 18, 2019; 5 years ago
- Operating system: iOS
- Size: 9.2 MB
- Type: Music sequencer
- Website: alexandernaut.com/fuguemachine

Fugue Machine is a music sequencer created by San Francisco composer and software developer Alexander Randon, also known by his stage name as Alexandernaut. Marketed as the "world’s first multi-playhead piano roll," Fugue Machine allows the user to sequence a melody and have up to three variations of it play all at the same time. The application was originally released on October 8, 2015 for iOS, and quickly garnered notability for its intuitive methods of making complex pieces and for being the first app to be developed from the "Cultural Incubator" program by the Gray Area Foundation for the Arts.

== Summary ==
Fugue Machine is a "multi-playhead" sequencer where the user creates a melody sequence for four playheads to perform at different tempos, directions, and pitches. The melody is programmed by two-finger panning, which allows the user to change the position of multiple notes, and three-finger panning which alters the velocity and length of MIDI notes. The melody can last for up to eight measures.

There are seven parameters that control the performance of the playheads: "style," which determines the direction of the playhead including forward, reverse, forward-reverse, and reverse-forward, tempo, which determines how fast or slow the playhead moves in relation to the "master tempo," "start," which determines when a playhead begins moving, "invert switch," which inverts the pitches of the notes from the melody, "octave," which changes the pitch of the entire melody by whole octaves, "pitch," which changes the pitch of the melody by single notes, and "velocity," how loud the playhead performs the notes. Fugue Machine allows for the easy creation of polyrhythmic music by having the "tempo" parameters be in multiplied or divided numbers, such as a playhead being performed eight times slower than the "master tempo" when set at ÷8. The app also has a "shift slider" that moves the pitches of all the playheads up and down. Up to 128 pieces can be saved in Fugue Machine.

== Development ==
Randon studied the works of Johann Sebastian Bach, a composer who popularized the fugue compositional technique, while in college. He became obsessed with how fugue involved using mathematical operations, something that would later become a major part of his compositions. In applying math in his works, Randon, composing in a digital audio workstation, would have to copy and paste a melody he sequenced and manually program variations of it in different pitches, speeds, and directions, which took a very long time to do. This give Randon the idea of developing a machine that could compose variations of a single theme automatically. He explained, "I was a main-track engineering student, so the idea of combining something I was good at (math) to something I wanted to be good at (music), seemed obvious." Randon spent years programming multiple drafts of Fugue Machine, but failed due to problems of coming up with a proper user interface. Randon then decided, out of desperation, to focus on the back end of the program first: "I quickly realized that the most eloquent technical design was to have one music sequence being read multiple times. Then it hit me: That's a piano roll with multiple playheads! I seriously jumped up and down, alone in my music studio, for far too long." This became the basis for making the final product of Fugue Machines, which took eight months to program.

Randon made Fugue Machine as part of a program fostered by the Gray Area Foundation for the Arts named "Cultural Incubator", where participants are committed to developing an app that combines elements of art and technology to impact society. Fugue Machine became the first application to be produced as part of Cultural Incubator. The most complicated part of programming the application was coding the "Note On" messages it sends to external synthesizers when one note is being played simultaneously by more than one playhead. Randon had to do this since many external synthesizers vary in terms of how they handle more than one message performing the same note at the same time: some make a second voice perform the second message or replace the first one, and some even crash.

== Reception and release ==
On October 8, 2015, Alexandernaut released Fugue Machine for iOS and a fourteen-track album entitled Songs for Fugue Machine he made using the app. The application quickly gained significant attention from both users and publication in only a few months due to its easy method of making intricate compositions. As CDM stated, "It’s really what melodic sequencers in the computer age ought to be – not primitive imitations of what you can do with melodies, but accessible automatons, treating the melody as fluidly as it appears on a displays."

Journalist Francis Preve described the program as "innovative" and "instantly addictive," praising its interactivity (in particular its shift slider), its external MIDI feature, and the variety of complex musical styles and "ethereal textures" that could be produced intuitively which ranged from "ambient to cinematic to trance-like." The application garnered an "App of the week" review from Stuff magazine, where writer Craig Grannell labeled it "a superb iPad music app, up there with the very best." His only criticisms were that the controls were a "bit fiddly" and it lacked in the number of available save slots.

== Notable uses ==
Electronica producer Max Cooper used Fugue Machine in making his extended play Chromos (2017).
