= Auxy: Beat Studio =

Music sequencer app for the Apple iPad

- App icon
- Original authors: Henrik Lenberg, Fredrik Gadnell, Andreas Öman
- Developer: Auxy AB
- Initial release: 29 October 2014; 11 years ago
- Stable release: 7.0.1 / 4 April 2025; 7 months ago
- Operating system: iOS 10.3 or later, iPadOS 10.3 or later
- Platform: iPhone, iPad, iPod Touch
- Available in: English
- Type: Music production
- Website: auxy.co

Auxy: Beat Studio, commonly referred to as Auxy, is a sequencer app for creating electronic music loops and full-length tracks. It was made for the Apple iPad by a three-person development team and released for free on the iOS App Store on October 29, 2014.

== History ==
Henrik Lenberg, one of the co-creators of Auxy and co-founder of its eponymous music software startup, stated in an interview for Tech.eu that the goal of Auxy was to "help people make more music". It aimed to achieve this goal by dispensing with the historically consistent, technically-focused design of modern digital audio workstations—what he refers to as "spreadsheet music-making"—in favor of tools that are geared towards a "new generation" by way of touchscreen interfaces. Future plans for the app's development are focused on expanded features and instruments contained within in-app purchases.

Auxy was part of Apple's Best of 2014 and Editor's Choice classes of iPad apps, and while reviews of its initial release commented that its simplistic design had also hampered its versatility by omitting features such as MIDI exporting, interactivity with other devices or software, or a more varied instrument bank, its stripped-down functionality is considered more accessible to a general audience than other sequencer programs. Following its initial release, Auxy was updated the following year to support writing triplets and 1/32 notes in the editor and, through an in-app purchase, MIDI export functionality, which allows patterns created in Auxy to be routed to other programs or outboard hardware. The developers of Auxy soon came out with a new iPhone-compatible app, called Auxy for iPhone, also commonly referred to as Auxy, in 2015. It deals with electronic music loops, like the iPad version, but it deals with new synths and drum kits. Another difference is that the iPhone version has only 8 instruments for each drum kit, unlike the iPad version, which had 16. In January 2018, Auxy was updated to version 5, which included a redesigned drum sequencer, custom sample import functionality, more instruments, and most notably, a new subscription-based pricing model.
