= B-Step Sequencer =

MIDI sequencing software

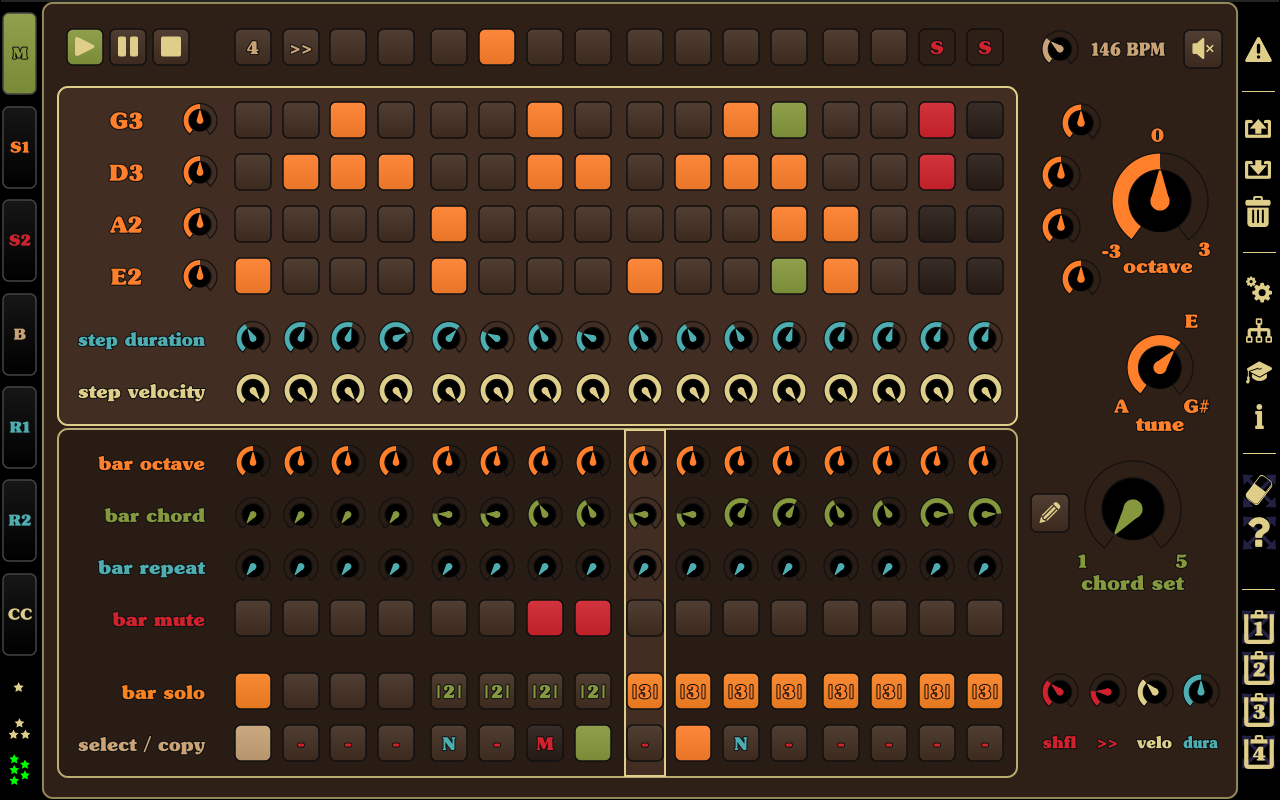
- Main user interface of B-Step Sequencer 2
- Developer(s): Monoplugs
- Initial release: December 23, 2013; 11 years ago
- Stable release: 2.0.2 / October 29, 2014; 10 years ago
- Written in: C++
- Operating system: Microsoft Windows, Mac OS X, Linux, iOS (iPad), Android, Raspbian (Raspberry Pi)
- Type: Music sequencer
- License: Trialware
- Website: surge-synth-team.org/b-step/

B-Step Sequencer is a multitrack software MIDI step sequencer that is available as either a standalone application or in audio plug-in format (VST and Audio Units). Primarily used to create melodical sequences to trigger soft or hardware synthesizer, whether in a studio environment or live on stage, it has a user interface based on pattern and TR music sequencers.

== History ==
The first version of B-Step Sequencer (1.0), developed by the German company Monoplugs, was released in December 2013 for Microsoft Windows, Mac OS X and Linux. In March 2014 Monoplugs released the B-Step Sequencer for iPad, providing the same functionality as for desktop computers. Version 2.0 was released in October 2014 with two new supported platforms: Android and Raspbian (Raspberry Pi).

== Features ==
B-Step Sequencer has a long list of features, including full MIDI and MIDI beat clock sync support, Sequencer Ratcheting, shuffle (swing), monophonic and polyphonic note playback modes.

=== User Interface ===
The user interface, which looks clean and is contrast rich, is designed for live performances without any need for a deep menu hierarchy. It shows all the important settings on the main interface and features drag and drop to copy settings on the fly.

=== Specification ===
- 16 steps per track
- 4 tracks per pattern
- 16 patterns
- playback of up to 4 patterns at the same time
- 5x MIDI out for synthesizer control
- sends and receives MIDI CC (trainable)
- 2x MIDI in and out for Novation Launchpad controllers
- 1x MIDI in and out for trainable MIDI controllers
- MIDI THRU (optional)
- MIDI beat clock thru (optional)
- 1x MIDI in for MIDI beat clock sync

== Editions ==
=== Standalone ===
B-Step Sequencer Standalone currently runs with recent versions of Windows (WinMM MIDI), Mac OS X (Core MIDI), Linux (ALSA MIDI), iPad (Core MIDI), Android (MIDI via USB) and Raspberry Pi (ALSA MIDI).

=== VST Plug-in ===
As a VST plug-in B-Step Sequencer can be used in well-known VST hosts like Ableton Live, Cubase, Bitwig, REAPER or Renoise. The VST version is available for 32-bit and native 64-bit CPU architectures on Linux, Microsoft Windows and Mac OS X.

=== Audio Units Plug-in ===
On Mac OS X B-Step Sequencer can be run as an Audio Units plug-in in Audio Units hosts like Logic Pro.

== Versions ==
B-Step Sequencer is available as either a trial (demo) or a commercial version. The trial version excludes saving of user projects and is time limited to 30 minutes. After application restart or unloading it in the plug-in host it is possible to use it again for 30 minutes. The commercial version is not time limited and it has the project save feature available.

== Support ==
Support for B-Step Sequencer is provided through a HTML user manual. Users may also register for the official Monoplugs forum or contact Monoplugs directly.
