= Z-Maestro =

MIDI and digital audio sequencer

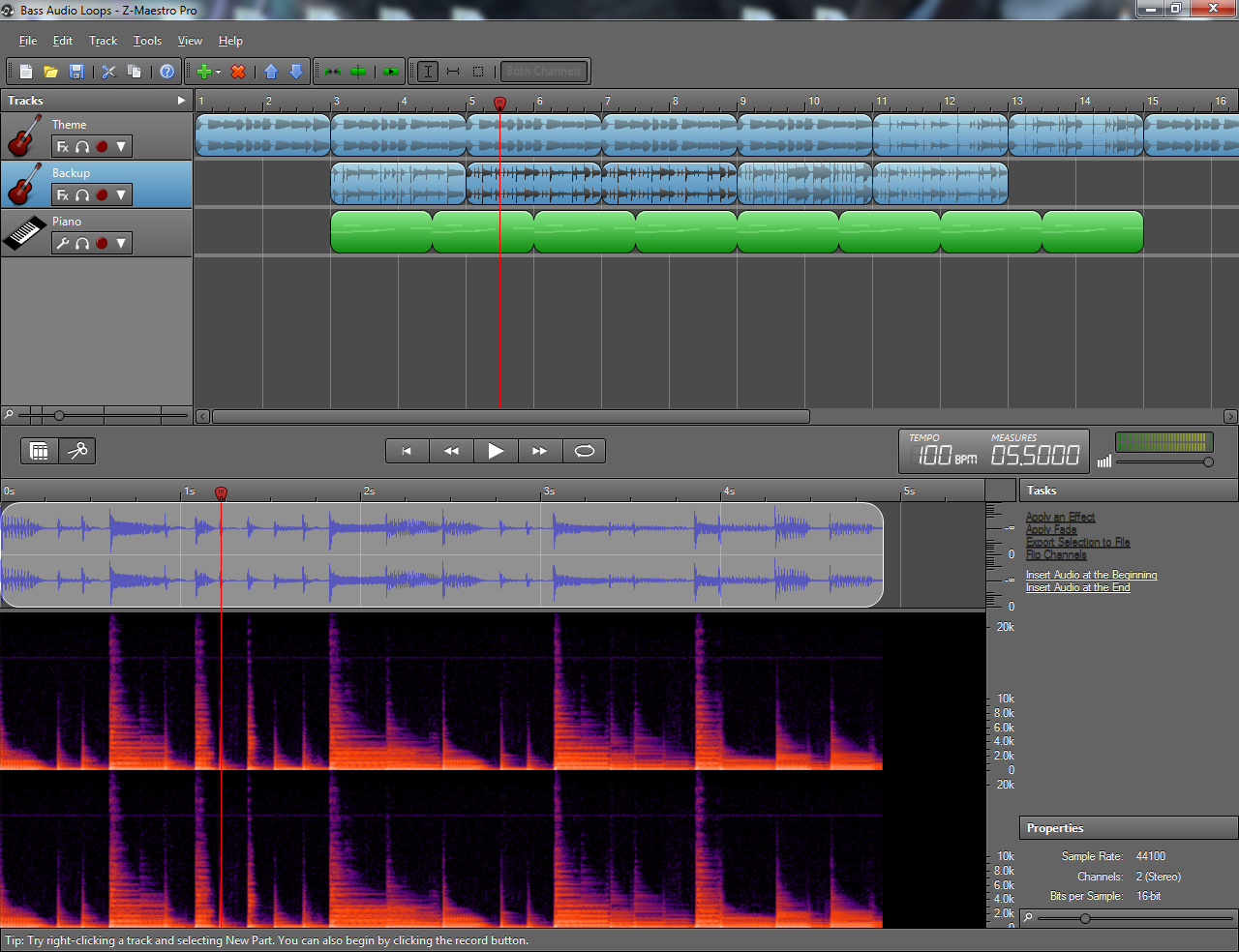
- Z-Maestro 1.4
- Developer: Z-Systems
- Stable release: 1.5.7 / 16 October 2011; 15 years ago
- Operating system: Microsoft Windows
- Type: MIDI sequencer and digital audio workstation
- License: Proprietary
- Website: www.z-sys.org/products/zmaestro

Z-Maestro is a MIDI and digital audio sequencer designed with a focus on ease of use and power for the Windows platform. Developed by Z-Systems, it has seen over a dozen regular releases spaced two to six months apart.

== History ==
Z-Maestro development began in 2006 in an attempt to introduce a product that could compete with Apple GarageBand for ease of use and professional products like FL Studio and Logic Pro for features. Pre-1.0 releases were released as free betas. Z-Maestro is developed in VB.NET for the Microsoft .NET 3.5 SP1 platform.

Z-Maestro 1.0 was released as the first commercial version on April 26, 2009 with a price of $30. This first major release still had the prototype interface of the betas. Version 1.1 introduced a newly polished interface similar in style to the Adobe Creative Suite. This new interface is adjustable through the options dialog.

== Features ==
- Sequence instrument (MIDI), drum (MIDI), and audio tracks
- Edit instrument and drum parts in a roll editor
- Edit audio in both a waveform view and a spectrum view
- Apply audio effects destructively in the audio editor or non-destructively to entire audio tracks
- Renders MIDI tracks using SoundFont software instruments
- Edit audio in the audio editor using on-clip controls, including for the spectral view

== Free version limitations ==
Z-Maestro may be downloaded as the free of charge "lite" version, subject to some limitations. The "lite" version may not be used to create commercial works and projects are limited to three tracks. Audio import and export features are also limited to WAV files.
