= Volca Keys =

Subtractive analogue synthesizer

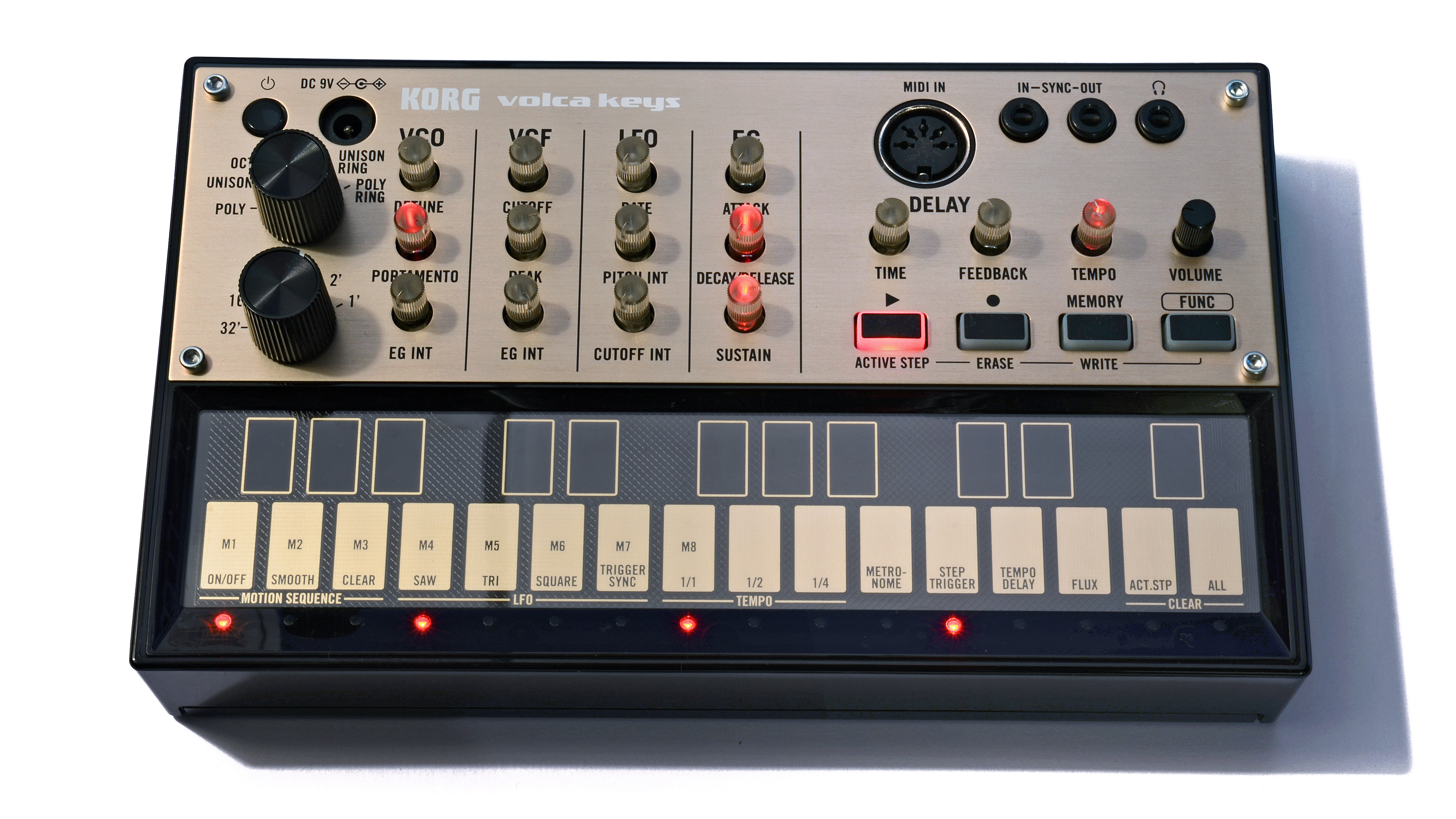
- Manufacturer: Korg

Technical specifications
- Polyphony: Three (paraphonic)
- Oscillator: Three voltage-controlled oscillators (one per voice)
- Synthesis type: Subtractive synthesis
- Filter: Voltage-controlled filter
- Attenuator: ADSR envelope with linked decay and release
- Effects: Delay

Input/output
- Keyboard: Touch plate
- External control: MIDI, sync

The Volca Keys is an analogue synthesizer manufactured by the Japanese music technology company Korg. It was announced in April 2013 at MusikMesse and was at the time one of the few affordable analogue synthesizers available. The Volca Keys uses subtractive synthesis to create sounds and is three-note paraphonic, meaning that it can play chords with all voices sharing a single voltage-controlled filter (VCF).

The Volca Keys is part of Korg's Volca line of compact hardware synthesizers and drum machines; like other models, it features a 16-step sequencer and can be powered using batteries.

== Release ==
The Volca Keys was announced in April 2013 at MusikMesse along with the Volca Beats and Volca Bass, and proved a success for Korg.

Critics received the Volca Keys well. At the time of its release, it filled the niche of an affordable analogue synthesizer, which contributed to its success. Comments were made on its inexpensive price and quality of sounds. MusicTech stated, "Korg has listened to its customers and managed to hit the perfect balance of price and features" and Future Music seemed to agree, saying that "the Volca synth is revolutionary at this price point" and suggesting that "everybody should own one".

== Design ==
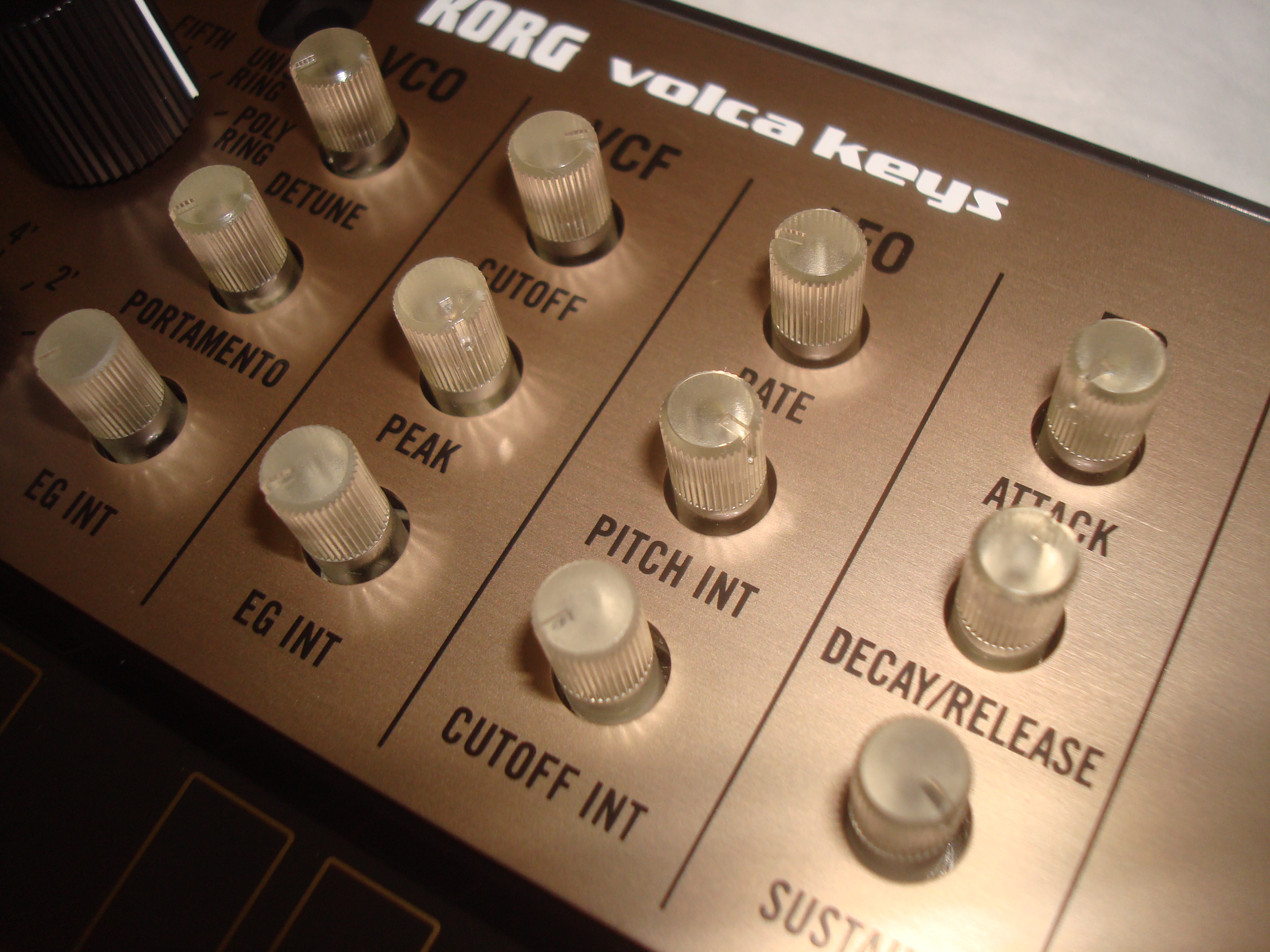
Close-up of Volca Keys' controls

The Volca Keys has a gold faceplate and transparent enclosure. It is lightweight and is a small size. The knobs on the front are made of transparent and solid plastic and are similar to those on Korg's Monotron, although the build quality is improved. Connections on the Volca Keys include MIDI in, sync in/out and 9V DC power input. The synthesizer can also be run off of batteries. The Volca Keys has analogue circuitry but all control signals are digital, allowing parameter control over MIDI. According to Korg, "[the] CPU [controlling the Volca Keys] has a 10-bit DAC".

The keyboard is a touch plate with no velocity sensitivity. It houses a 16-step sequencer with motion sequencing, Korg's version of parameter automation. The only way to set sequencer steps is by the real-time recording mode. Step entries can be made unquantized with "flux" mode. The sequencer also has an "active step" tool for mutes and shortened patterns.

=== Signal path ===
Volca Keys demonstration
A demonstration of the basic sound of the Volca Keys

The Volca Keys' oscillators are digitally-controlled analogue oscillators. They can use sawtooth or square waveforms depending on the mode of the synthesizer (square in ring modes, sawtooth in all others). Controls over oscillator pitch, detune, portamento (glide) and envelope intensity are available. The mode controls the polyphony of the Volca Keys. Five modes are available: monophonic modes are unison, octaves, fifth and unison ring; paraphonic modes are poly and poly ring. While in unison modes, the oscillators can be detuned from the unison pitch by up to a semitone. Modulation can be applied to oscillator pitch from the envelope generator.

Volca Keys looped sequence demonstration
Simple demo loop with built-in filtration effects and other adjustments applied live during playback

The Volca Keys has a digitally-controlled analogue low-pass filter, a recreation of the filter from Korg's MiniKorg-700S. Control is available over filter cutoff, modulation from envelope generator and resonance. The filter can be pushed into self-oscillation.

Modulation on the Volca Keys comes from two sources, an ASR envelope generator and low-frequency oscillator (LFO). The envelope is routed to amplitude by default but can be used to modulate the pitch and filter cutoff. The LFO has three waveforms: saw, triangle and square. Controls over LFO rate and depth of modulation to are available. The LFO can be synced to the start of a note.

The Volca Keys features a delay circuit, which some have likened to that of Korg's Monotron Delay. It is low-fidelity, with low sample rates for the audio processing. The delay has control over time and feedback; the former can be synced to the sequencer tempo.

== See also ==
- Volca Modular – another Volca, inspired by "West Coast" style synthesizers.
