= Cakewalk (disambiguation) =

Cakewalk is a traditional African American form of music and dance.

Cakewalk may refer to:

== Arts and entertainment ==
- Cakewalk (album), a 1991 album by House of Freaks
- Cakewalk (carnival game), a game played at carnivals, funfairs, and fundraising events
- Cakewalk, a music composed by Norman Leyden
- Cakewalk (film), a 2019 Hindi film
- Cakewalk, a play by Peter Feibleman about his relationship with Lillian Hellman
- Cakewalk, a game for the Atari 2600 by CommaVid
- Golliwogg's Cakewalk, a composition for solo piano by Claude Debussy
- "Cakewalk" (Oscar Peterson composition), a jazz composition by Oscar Peterson

== Other uses ==
- Cakewalk (company), a Boston-based company which produced music software
  - Cakewalk (sequencer), their music sequencing software
  - Cakewalk by BandLab, a digital audio workstation and successor to the above
