= Volca Bass =

Subtractive analogue bass synthesizer

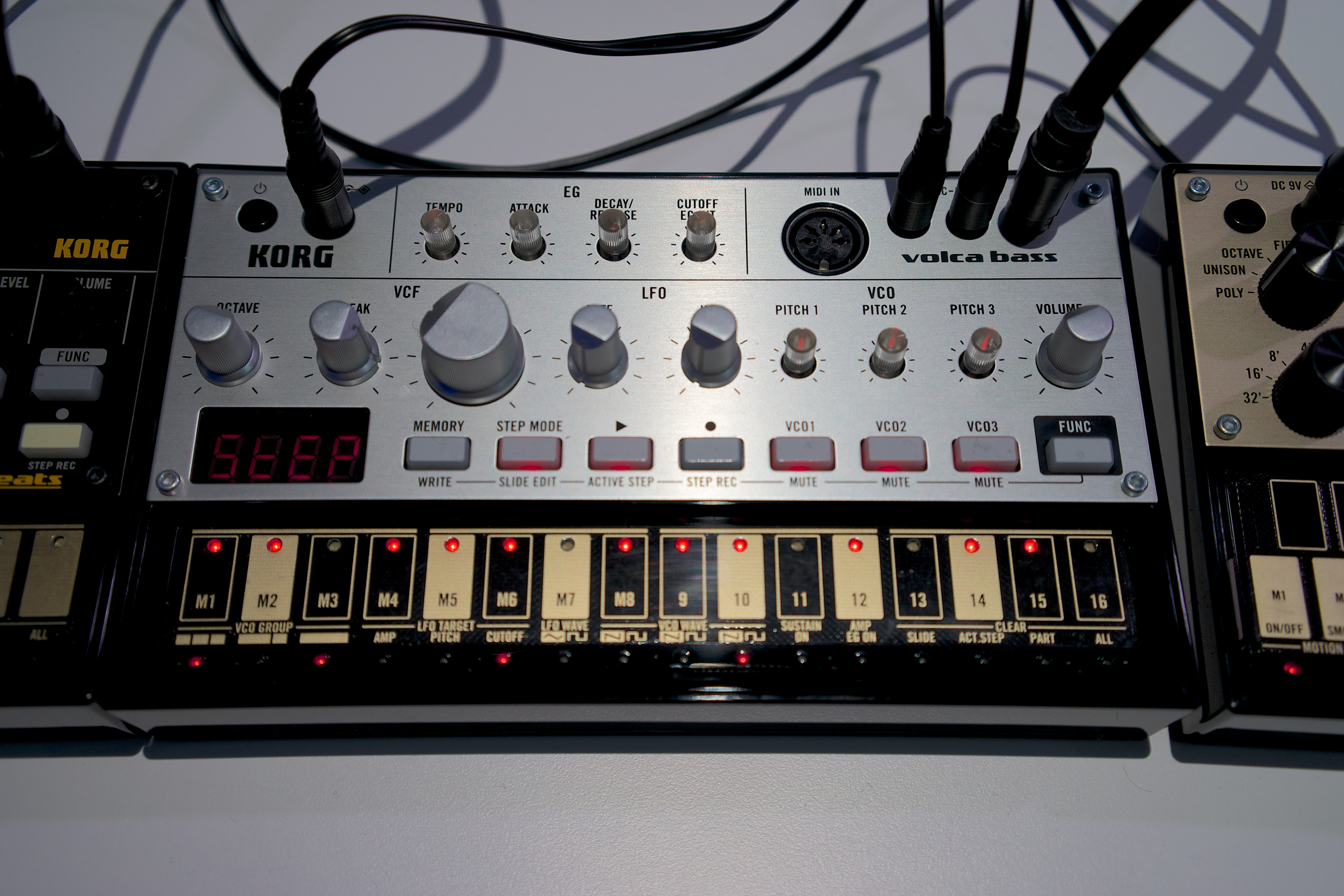
- Manufacturer: Korg

Technical specifications
- Polyphony: monophonic
- Oscillator: 3 voltage-controlled oscillators
- LFO: single LFO (triangle and square wave)
- Synthesis type: analog subtractive
- Filter: voltage-controlled filter

Input/output
- Keyboard: one octave touchplate
- External control: MIDI and sync

The Volca Bass is an analogue bass synthesizer manufactured by the Japanese music technology company Korg. It was released in April 2013 alongside the Volca Keys and Volca Beats.

== Release ==
The Volca Bass was released in April 2013 at Musikmesse Frankfurt alongside the Volca Keys and Volca Beats. The Volca Bass was received well by critics, with MusicTech calling it "the best sounding of the three [original Volcas]".

== Design ==
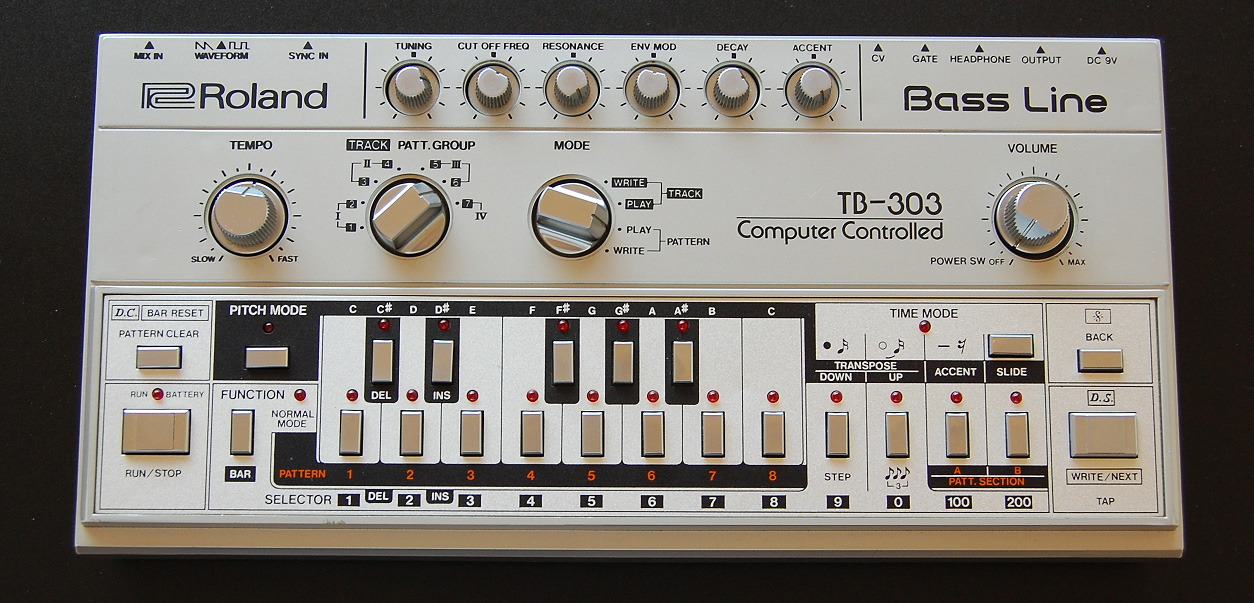
The TB-303: an inspiration for the Volca Bass

The design of the Volca bass has drawn comparisons not only to Korg's Electribe series but also to Roland's TB-303 bass synthesiser. As with other Volcas, The Volca Bass has MIDI connectivity, a 16-step sequencer and can run off batteries. The Volca Bass follows the standard architecture of a subtractive synthesiser: it produces sound using three voltage-controlled oscillators (VCO), a resonant low-pass voltage-controlled filter (VCF) and a voltage-controlled amplifier (VCA). The VCOs can be individually switched between sawtooth or square waveforms. Oscillators can be detuned up to an octave away from a given pitch and have a range of over six octaves. The Volca Bass' 12 db/octave diode ring filter is a recreation of the filter of the MiniKorg 700s. Modulation is supplied by an ADR envelope generator (EG) with switchable sustain and a low-frequency oscillator (LFO) with square and triangle waveforms capable of reaching audio-rate modulation. Using the sequencer, the Bass' VCOs can be sequenced paraphonically, sharing the same filter but playing in harmony.
