= Volca Beats =

Hybrid drum machine

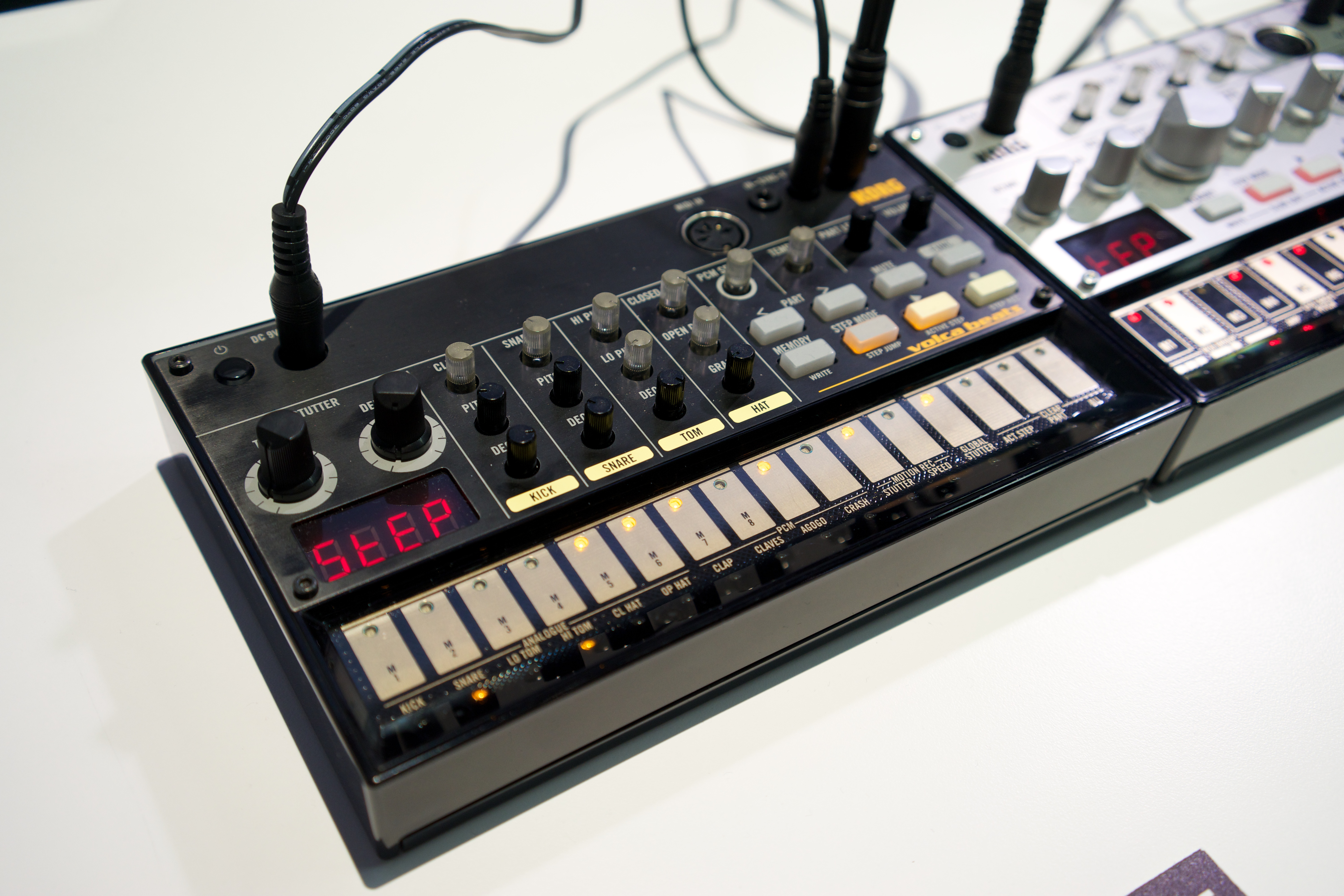
- Manufacturer: Korg

Technical specifications
- Polyphony: Ten voices, one per track
- Oscillator: Analogue drum circuits and PCM samples.
- Synthesis type: Analogue and sample based synthesis
- Effects: Stutter effect

Input/output
- Keyboard: Touch plate
- External control: MIDI and sync in/out

The Volca Beats is a hybrid drum machine produced by the Japanese music technology manufacturer Korg. It was released in April 2013 along with the Volca Keys and Volca Bass. The Volca Beats uses both analogue synthesis and PCM samples to produce drum sounds. It is part of Korg's Volca line of affordable synthesizers and drum machines, it has a 16-step sequencer and can run off batteries.

== Release ==
The Volca Beats was released in April 2013 at Musikmesse Frankfurt alongside the Volca Keys and Volca Bass. It received positive reviews. MusicRadar stated that "the balance between functionality, ease of use and playability is great". However, some criticism was made of its snare circuit.

== Design ==
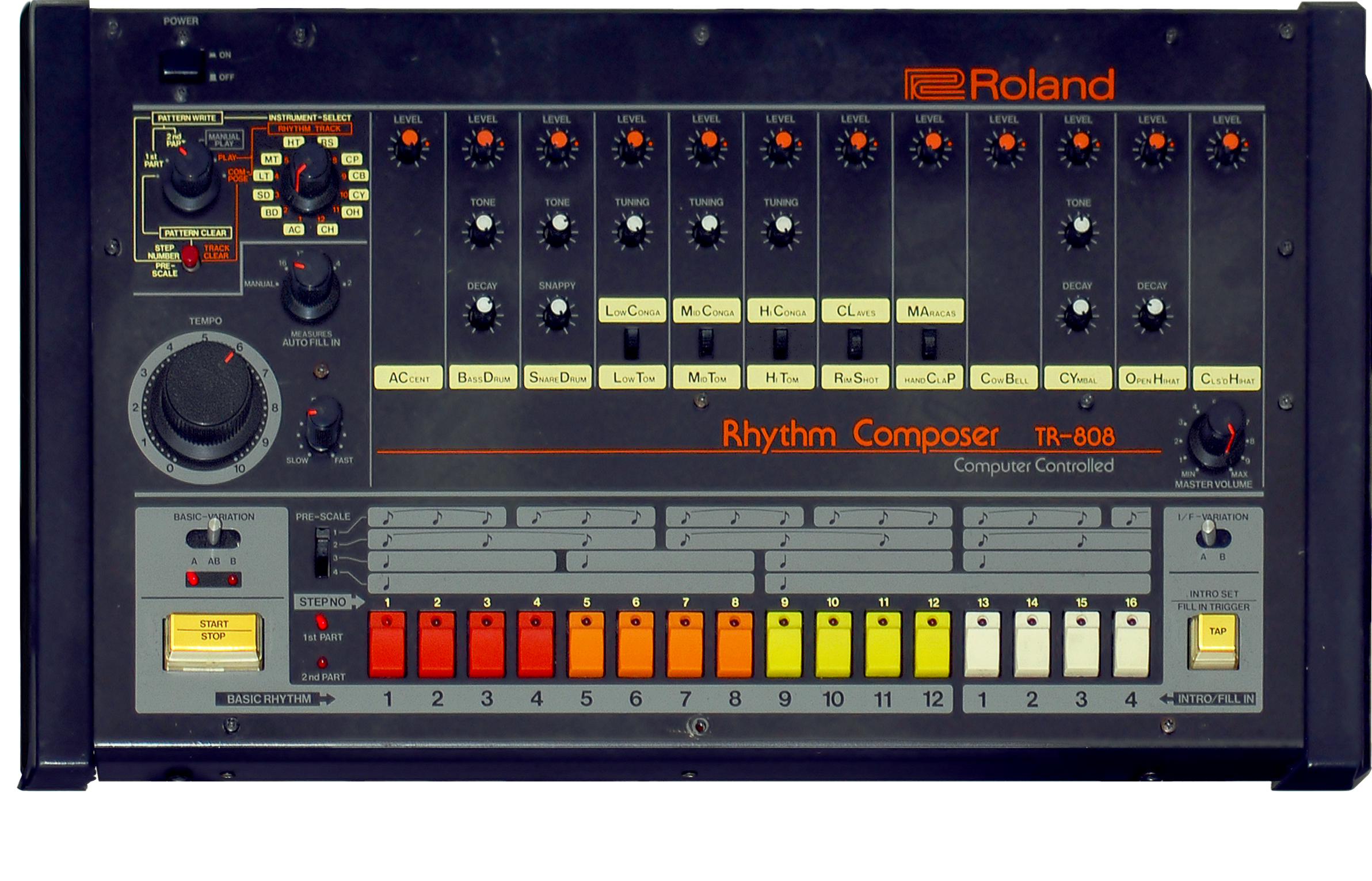
The Roland TR-808, an inspiration for the Volca Beats

The Volca Beats has a black faceplate, with gold accents and keys; the enclosure is made of black plastic. Its design is partially inspired by the Roland TR-808 and TR-606. It features a 16-step sequencer with motion sequencing for sequencing parameter changes. The sequencer also has "active step" and "step jump" functions for irregular time signatures and build-ups. Connection points include 9V DC power, MIDI in, sync in/out and a single stereo output. The Volca Beats can also be powered by batteries and has a built-in speaker.

=== Sound engine ===
The Volca Beats' sound engine consists of two sections, the analogue drum section and the PCM sample section, along with a stutter effect. Stutter is a retrigger effect, with controls over time and depth. It behaves almost like a delay, retriggering either all voices or a single part. Each section is split up into tracks, of which there are ten in total. Each track has a different sound, e.g. hi-hats, kick.

The analogue section is made up of six tracks that Korg say are "common analogue vintage circuits":

- Kick – a circuit similar to the TR-808's kick drum, it has control over click (addition of a transient), pitch and decay.
- Snare – has control over include pitch, decay and "snappy", which controls the amount of white noise in the snare. Lower levels can stand in for a rimshot.
- Toms – both high and low toms. They have individual tuning but share a decay envelope.
- Hats – both closed and open hats on the Volca Beats. Each has an individual decay but shares a "grain" control, which controls pitch.

PCM sample tracks have control over individual volume and playback speed. There are four different tracks: clave, agogo, clap and cymbal.
