= Monotron =

Analogue synthesizer series

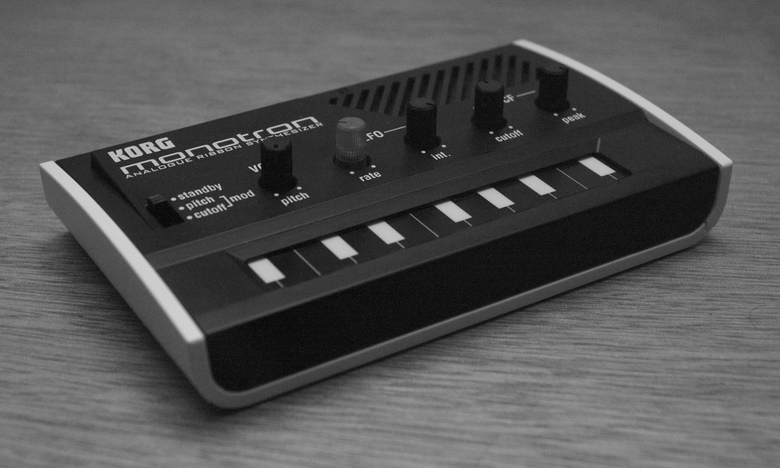
- The original Korg monotron
- Manufacturer: Korg
- Dates: 2010– (Monotron); 2011– (Monotron Delay); 2011– (Monotron Duo)

Technical specifications
- Polyphony: monophonic
- Oscillator: Sawtooth VCO, gated VCA
- LFO: sawtooth
- Filter: VCF
- Aftertouch expression: No
- Velocity expression: No

Input/output
- Keyboard: Ribbon controller, marked with 18 keys A–D (1½ octaves)

Korg is the manufacturer of the Monotron series, which comprises the original Monotron, Monotron Delay, and Monotron Duo

Monotron (stylised as monotron in all lowercase) is the collective name of a series of miniature monophonic analogue synthesisers produced by Korg, a Japanese manufacturer of electronic musical instruments. There are three models in the series: the original Monotron (released 2010), the Monotron Duo (released 2011) and the Monotron Delay (released 2011). The models share a minimalist set of synthesis components, consisting only of a voltage-controlled oscillator, voltage-controlled filter, a voltage-controlled amplifier and a low-frequency oscillator.

Critics received the Monotron series well, citing the synthesisers' analogue circuits, which were a novelty at the time. The Monotrons proved successful with consumers, especially with electronics hobbyists, who made modifications to the synthesisers' designs. Korg did not originally intend for the Monotrons to be used for this purpose: rather, it was a consequence of the company labeling the synthesisers' PCB solder points and publicly releasing their schematics.

The Monotron played a role in an "analogue revival" of synthesisers by showing that analogue synthesisers could still be popular in the digital era. Korg's decision to release the Monotron in 2010 emboldened other manufacturers to produce their own offerings, making analogue synthesisers popular again. Korg continued to release other analogue offerings, such as the Monotribe (released in 2011).

== Monotron ==
Announced in the summer of 2010 at the German music exposition Musikmesse, the Monotron was Korg's first analogue synthesiser to be released in two decades (the last release being the Trident mkII). The Monotron was designed by Korg's Tatsuya Takahashi.

=== Design ===
Monotron measures 12 cm × 7 cm (4.7 in × 2.8 in), weighs approximately 100 grams (3.5 oz) and has a monochrome black-and-white design. It has a continuous ribbon controller for pitch and gate, similar to the touch controller found on Korg's Koass Pad line. The ribbon controller is also connected to the filter cutoff. Attached to the faceplate, there are five knobs for changing parameters.

In terms of its sound engine, the Monotron is relatively bare-bones and only includes the basic elements of a monophonic synthesiser. Monotron has a voltage-controlled oscillator (VCO), voltage-controlled filter (VCF), a simple gated voltage-controlled amplifier (VCA) and a low-frequency oscillator (LFO). The VCO and LFO both use a sawtooth waveform. The Monotron's VCO has a pitch tuning control and can reach frequencies below human hearing (i.e. <20 Hz). The LFO has a frequency range of <1 Hz to 900 Hz and can be routed to VCO pitch or filter cutoff, with control over modulation intensity. The VCF is the same design as the Korg-25 filter chip that used on the MS-10 and MS-20 synthesisers. It has control over cutoff and resonance. External connections on the Monotron consist of a headphone output and an audio input.

=== Reception ===
The Monotron was received well by critics, who praised its full analogue circuitry and affordable price. Concerns were raised about the synthesiser's ribbon keyboard and noisy signal output, but critics overlooked these problems. According to MusicRadar, a music journalism website:

Once you look past the limitations and remind yourself that this is a true analogue synth for a bargain price, the Monotron is a real winner. It's certainly not perfect, but it's an inspiring piece of equipment to have kicking around the studio and it sounds good enough to use it on a track.

Some critics suggested mitigating the ribbon keyboard's small size by using a stylus, or forgoing the keyboard entirely by using the Monotron as an effects unit for the sake of its filter. As an effects unit, the Monotron has seen usage in modular systems despite having no control voltage connections.

The Monotron's simple monophonic sound engine led to some comparing it to Moog Music's Micromoog and Korg's own MS-10. The synthesiser's small form factor and analogue circuitry made others draw parallels between the Monotron and the Stylophone, a miniature analogue electronic keyboard musical instrument created in 1967 by the British inventor Brian Jarvis. The British consumer electronics magazine Stuff called the Monotron "the new Stylophone" following its release. The magazine stated:

While it packs all the charm of the retro Stylophone into a really small, pocketable package, it also manages to squeeze a whole lot of brains into its shell as well.

Monotron was nominated for Make's 2011 Makey Awards. In their nomination, they noted the Monotron's accessible circuit board and inexpensive price. The nomination was titled "Best Product Documentation". The Monotron also won the "Hardware Synth Under $500" category at the 2011 Electronic Musician Editor's Choice Awards, with comments made about its "great sound".

== Monotron Delay ==
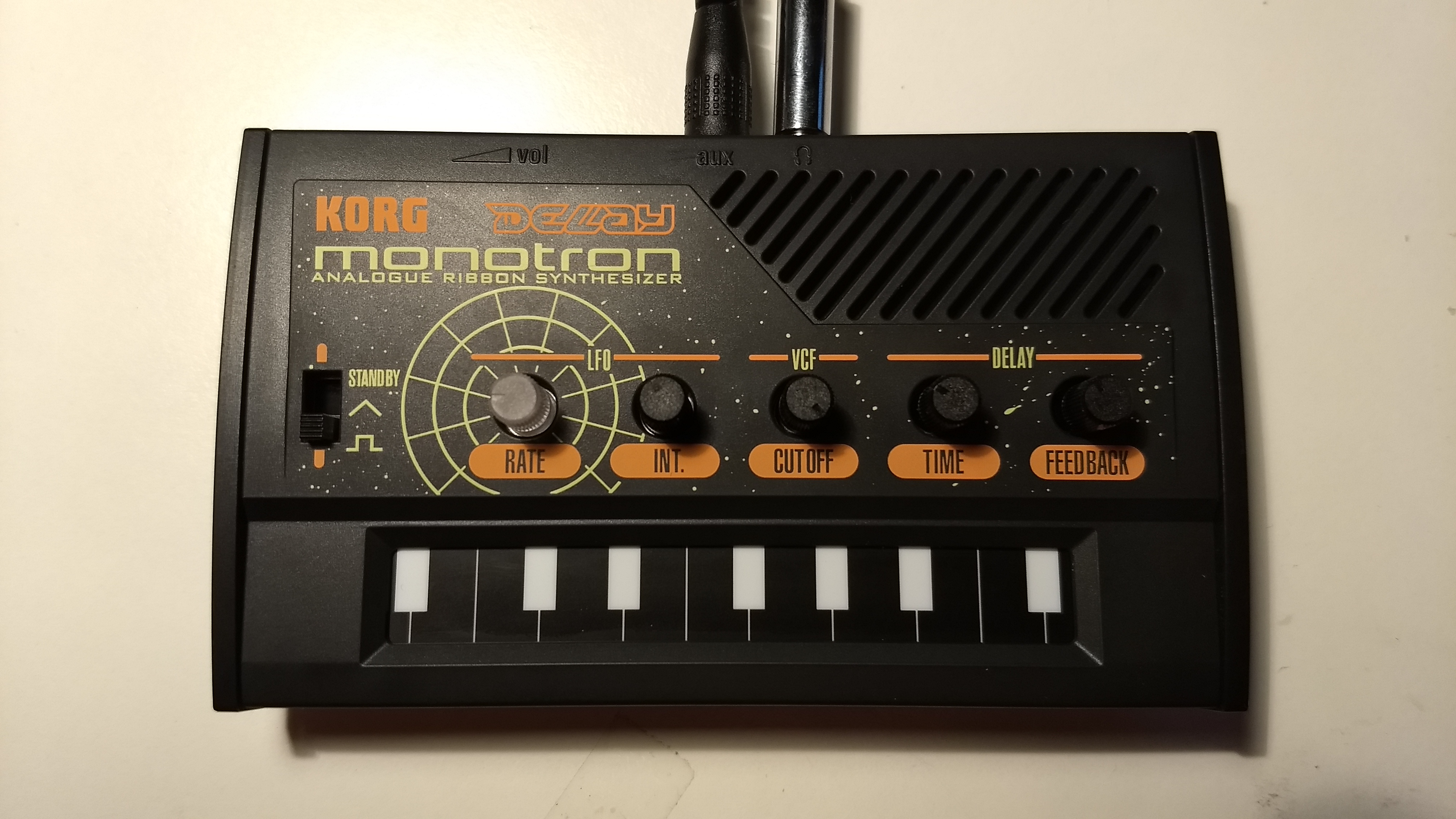
The Monotron Delay

The Monotron Delay was announced in November 2011. It was later exhibited at the 2012 NAMM Show, an annual music trade show.

The Delay has a design more similar to the original Monotron than its sibling, the Monotron Duo. Its faceplate is black and orange, with additional writing in UV paint. The Delay's ribbon controller is unquantised and spans four octaves. Its markings—ostensibly representing a keyboard little over an octave in size—are purely decorative and do not correspond to the pitch output nor the ribbon's actual range.

The monophonic sound engine of the Monotron Delay includes a single VCO, an LFO, a VCF and a delay circuit. The VCO uses a sawtooth waveform and has a maximum frequency of around 4 kHz. The VCF is the same as the other Monotrons but only has control over cutoff. The LFO can reach frequencies as low as 0.02 Hz and is connected to oscillator pitch. It can be a triangle (blendable between sawtooth and ramp) or pulse (with PWM) waveform. The delay circuit is based on the PT2399 echo processor chip and has control over time and feedback. Maximum delay times are around one second. The delay will self oscillate at high feedback levels.

== Monotron Duo ==
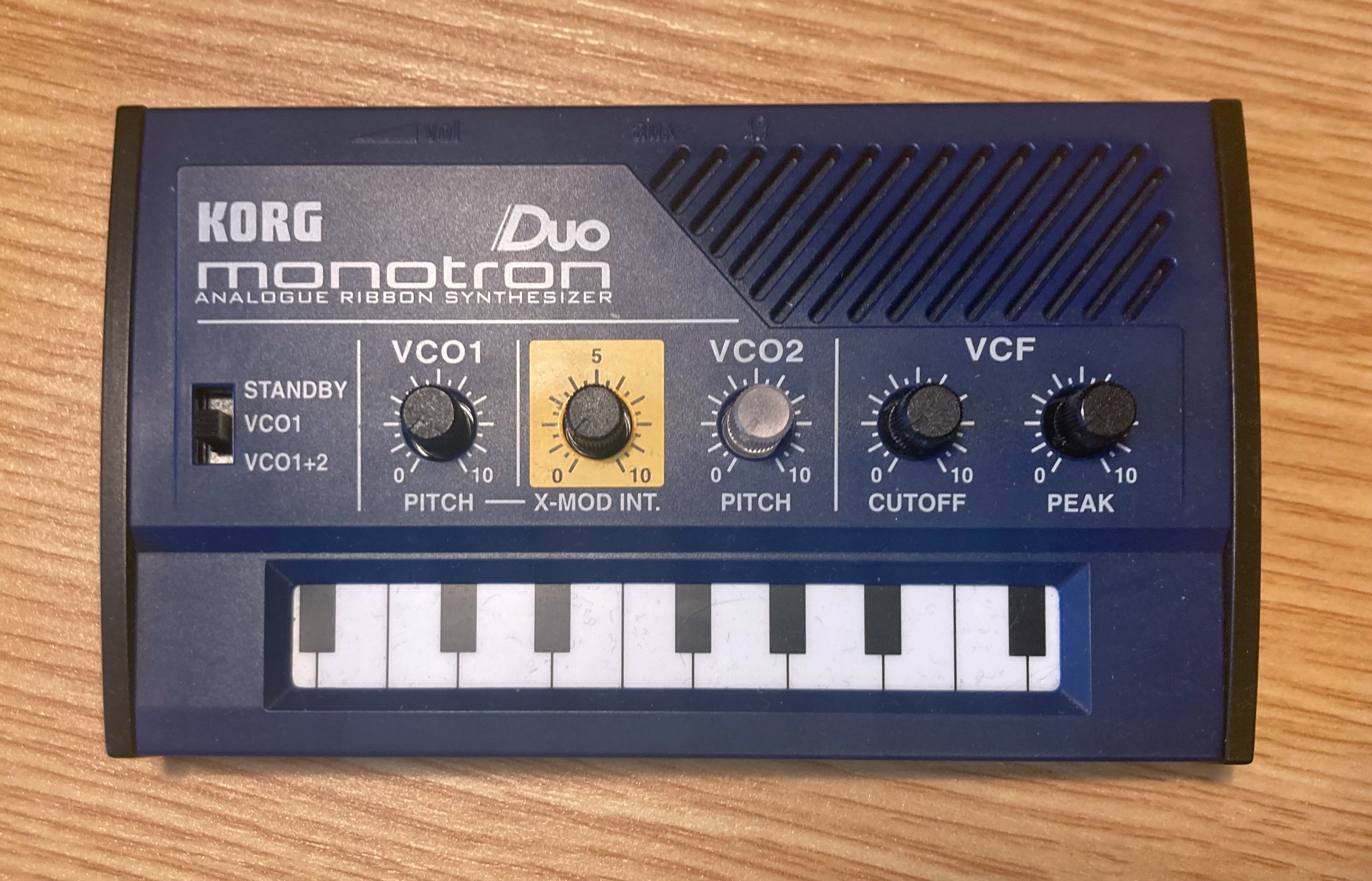
The Monotron Duo

The Monotron Duo was announced alongside the Monotron Delay in 2011, and was also exhibited at the 2012 NAMM Show.

The Duo shares the same cosmetic design as the original Monotron but is instead coloured blue, with a yellow highlight. Like other Monotron models, the Monotron Duo has a ribbon controller (with a range of one octave). The ribbon controller has four playing modes: chromatic, major, minor (natural) and unquantised. Monotron Duo has an automatic tuning system to ensure tuning stability.

The Monotron Duo loses the LFO of the original Monotron and replaces it with an extra VCO, and a cross-modulation circuit. The dual VCOs use square waveforms and have a range of four octaves. VCO2's frequency is dependent on VCO1 so the synthesiser can be set to play in intervals. In terms of musical notes, the Duo's oscillators have a range of D_{1} to A_{6}. Although it has one oscillator more than its predecessor, the Monotron Duo is still monophonic. The cross-modulation circuit (named "X-mod" by Korg) is similar to the one found on Korg's Mono/Poly synthesiser. The 12 dB/octave MS-20 filter is also present on the Monotron Duo with control over cutoff and resonance.

== Legacy ==
=== Modifications ===
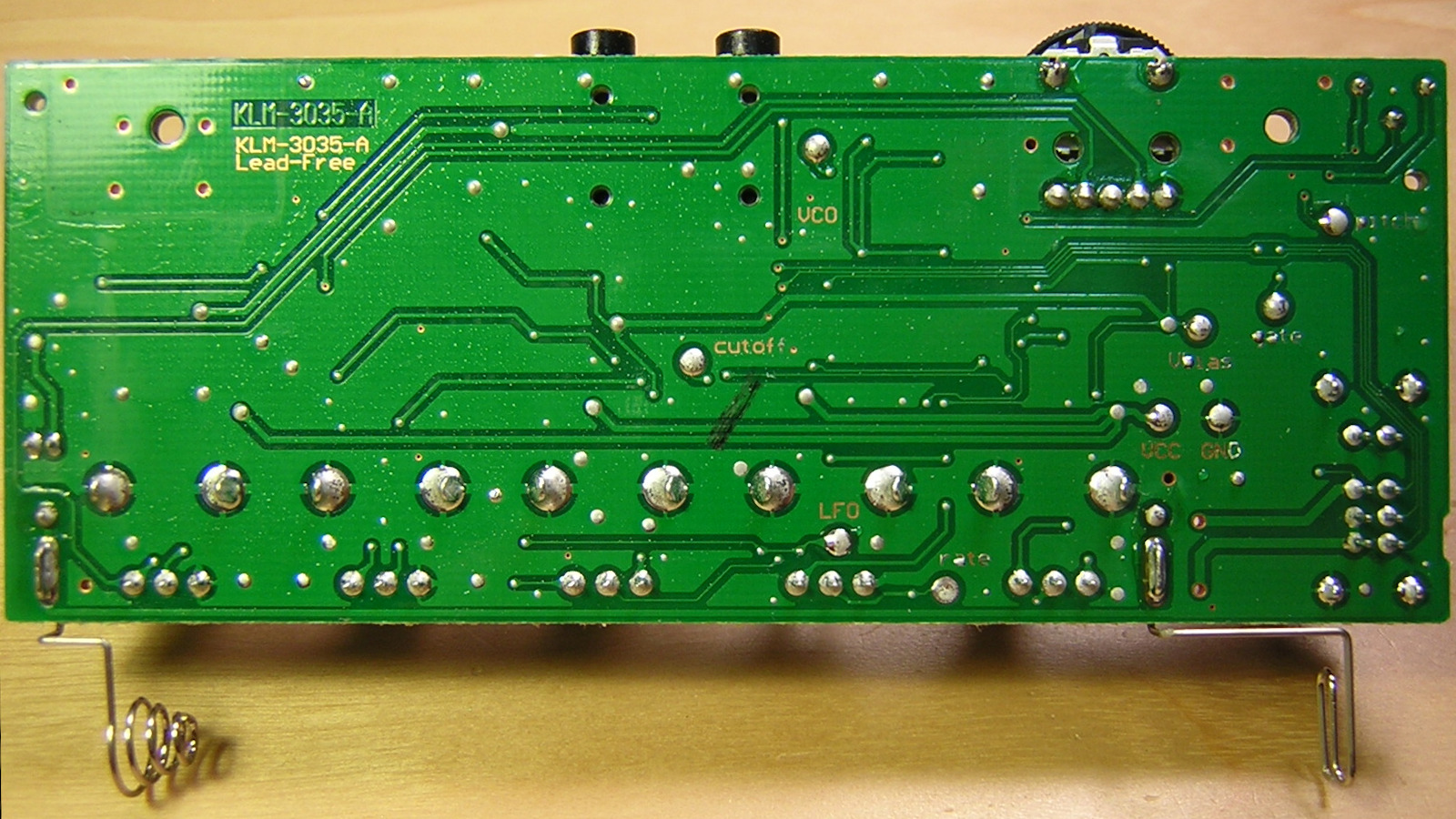
Reverse of Monotron's printed circuit board (PCB)

Due to their accessibility, the Monotron series became very popular candidates for modifications. Part of this popularity comes from Korg's decision to release the Monotrons' schematics online as well as labelling relevant solder points on the PCB. This labelling enabled consumers to easily create modifications to the synthesisers. According to Andrew Dubber, Professor of Music Industry Innovation at Birmingham City University:

The [Monotron] has a clearly labelled circuit board and publicly-released schematic, allowing any user to modify and develop the synthesiser for their own ends.

The synthesisers' designer, Tatsuya Takahashi, stated that making the Monotron modification-friendly was not Korg's original goal. Instead, it was to create an affordable analogue synthesiser. He believed that the Monotron being used for modifications was a by-product of the synthesiser's analogue circuits. In a 2013 interview, Takahashi said:

Our initial motivation was not to deliver something for the DIY crowd. It was to provide engagement with real analogue sonics at a price point that I could have bought when I was a kid [...] The low price point and the inherent simplicity of the analogue circuit just happened to resonate with the DIY crowd.

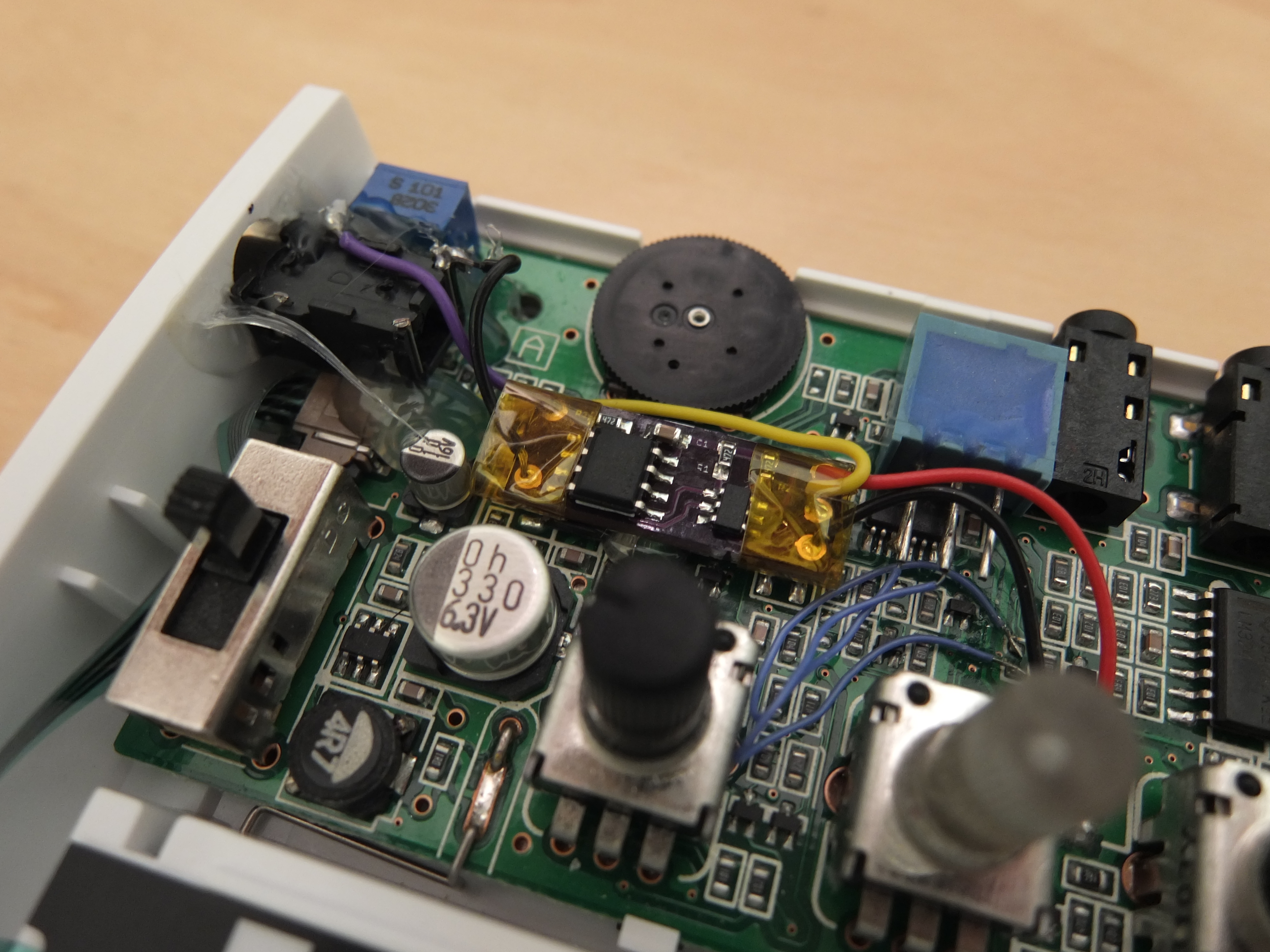
An example of a modification that adds a control voltage interface.

Due to the lack of external connections on the Monotrons (apart from audio in/out), the most popular modifications add control voltage (CV) or MIDI capabilities to control the synthesiser from other hardware. Mods adding MIDI support use microcontrollers, such as the Raspberry Pi or an Atmel ATmega328P, to convert between MIDI and CV.

Other modifications can be more extreme, like the "FrankenSynth". Nicknamed by the digital music resource site Ask.Audio, it is a heavily expanded Monotron designed in the United Kingdom by Harry Axten. Carrying out any modifications on a Monotron voids the synthesiser's warranty.

=== Analogue revival ===
The Monotron has been credited with helping to create an "analogue revival" of synthesisers. In the 1980s, analogue synthesisers began to lose popularity, being replaced by digital and, eventually, software synthesisers. By releasing Monotron in 2010, Korg showed that analogue synthesisers were still relevant and could sell well. This helped to revitalise Korg's image of being a maker of analogue synthesisers.

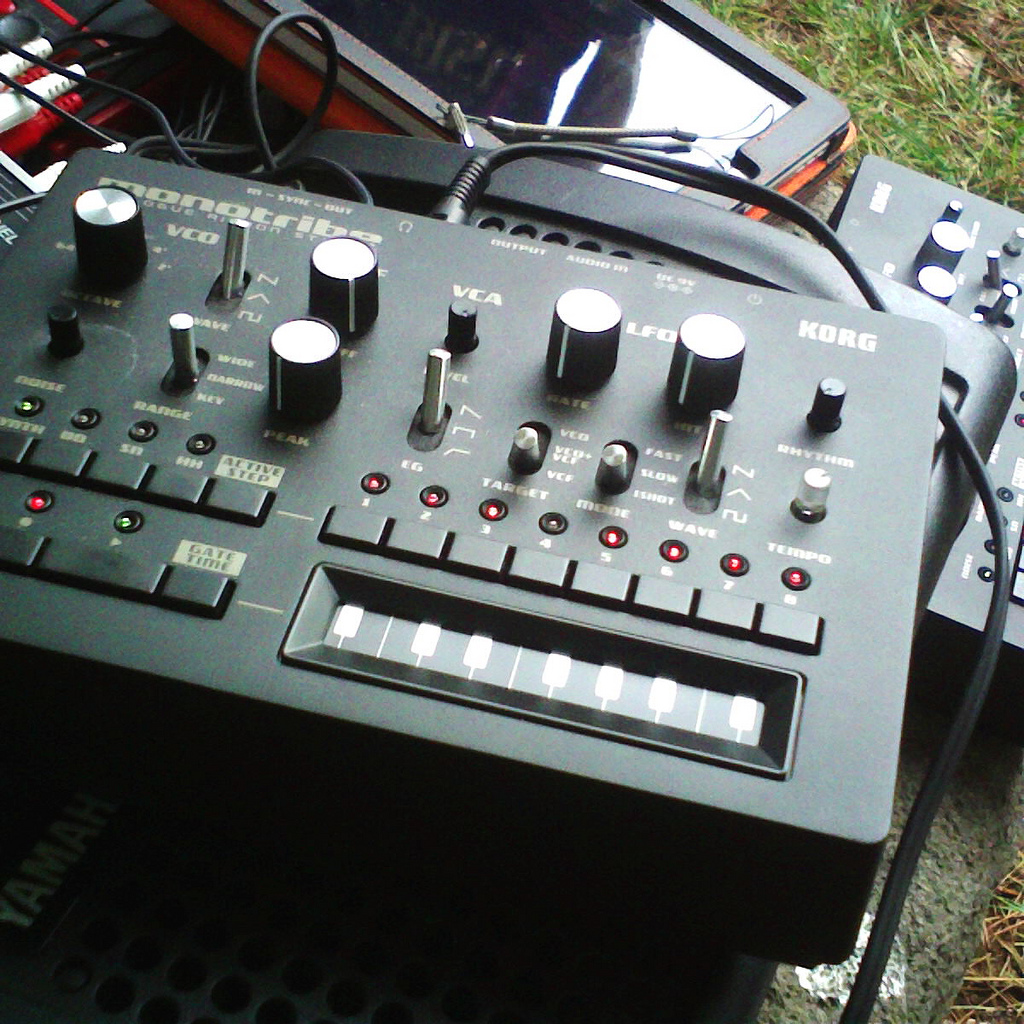
Korg's Monotribe combined features from their Monotron synthesiser and Electribe groovebox.

After the test run that was the Monotron, Korg continued to make analogue synthesisers. In 2011, the success of the Monotron prompted Korg to release the Monotribe, a groovebox combining elements of Korg's Monotron and Electribe series. The groovebox took inspiration from the ribbon controller of the Monotron, adding a switch to toggle between "wide" and "narrow" pitch ranges. As with the Monotron, the Monotribe's circuit diagrams and schematics were released. The Monotribe did sell units, but failed to attain the same popularity as the Monotron.

Through creating synthesisers like the Monotrons and Monotribe, Korg inspired other synthesiser companies to release their own new analogue synthesisers. These companies included Moog Music and Behringer, who later released their DeepMind 12 synthesiser in 2017.

=== Use in music ===
In popular music, Monotrons have been used by artists including Ana da Silva (The Raincoats), Martyn Ware (the Human League and Heaven 17), the Dutch producer Martijn Deijkers, Henry Laufer (Shlohmo) and the Portuguese-American musician RAC. Ware in particular listed the Monotron Delay as one of his "11 favourite hardware synths". A Monotron also appeared on Gorillaz's 2010 album, The Fall.

Monotron synthesisers have been used sparingly in contemporary classical music. There exists a Concerto for Korg Monotron, composed in 2015 by the Canadian composer Andrew Noseworthy. The concerto calls for the use of a Monotron Duo and Monotron Delay, and lasts around 15 minutes.

== See also ==
- Korg Volca – series of synthesisers produced by Korg
- List of Korg products
