= Cake (disambiguation) =

A cake is a sweet, baked form of food.

Cake may also refer to:

== Food ==
- Cake of figs
- Rice cake

== Arts, entertainment, and media ==
=== Fictional entities and plot elements ===
- Cake, a fictitious narcotic substance featured in the Brass Eye episode "Drugs"
- Cake, one of three hosts of Cake TV, played by Christa B. Allen
- Cake, a character from the fourth season of Battle for Dream Island, an animated web series
- Cake the Cat, a character in the television series Adventure Time
- "The Cake", a plot element in the video game Portal

=== Films ===
- Cake (2005 film), starring Heather Graham
- Cake: A Wedding Story (2007)
- Cake (2014 film), starring Jennifer Aniston
- Cake (2018 film)
- Cake (2022 film), a Nigerian romantic comedy

=== Music ===
==== Groups ====
- Cake (band), an American alternative rock band
- The Cake, a 1960s American vocal trio

==== Works ====
- Cake (album), by The Trash Can Sinatras, 1990
- "Cake" (Flo Rida song), 2017
- "Cake" (Itzy song), 2023
- "Cake", a song by Lily Allen from the 2018 album No Shame
- "Cake", a song by rapper Lloyd Banks from the 2006 album Rotten Apple
- "Cake", a song by Bloem
- "Cake", a song by Melanie Martinez from the digital deluxe edition of the 2015 album Cry Baby
- "Cake", a single by Loren Gray in 2020
- "Cake", a song by Remi Wolf from the deluxe version of the 2021 album Juno

=== Other uses in arts, entertainment, and media ===
- Cake (advertisement), 2007, for the Skoda Fabia automobile
- Cake (2006 TV series), a sitcom/craft show on CBS
- Cake (2019 TV series), an adult animated/live-action variety show on FXX
- "Cake", a season 2 episode of Servant (TV series)

== Brands and enterprises ==
- CAKE, the NASDAQ ticker symbol for The Cheesecake Factory restaurant chain
- Cake Financial, a financial services social network

== People ==
- Jonathan Cake (born 1967), English actor
- Russell Cake (born 1973), English cricketer

== Other uses ==
- CAKE (queue management algorithm)
- Cake (firework), also known as a candle barrage
- Cake Browser, a mobile web browser
- Cake number, the number of pieces into which a space can be cut
- CakePHP, a web development framework
- Filter cake, the buildup of residue on filters
- Press cake or oil cake, the residual solid matter after pressing the liquid from something
- Urinal cake, a term describing a urinal deodorizer block
- Yellowcake, a mixture of uranium oxides

== See also ==
- List of cakes
- Cakewalk (disambiguation)
- Kake (disambiguation)
