= Volca Modular =

Analogue synthesizer

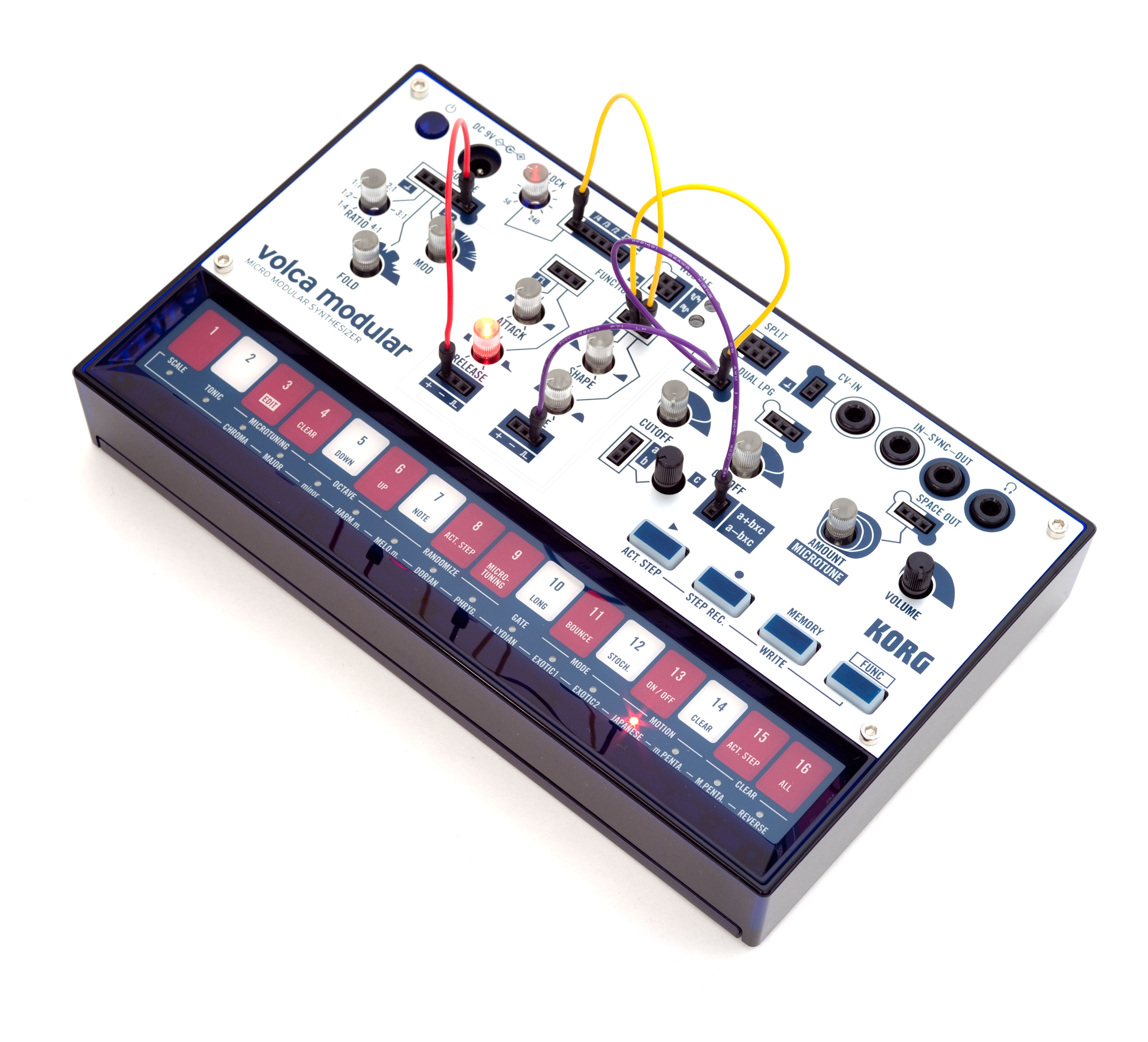
- The Volca Modular
- Manufacturer: Korg

Technical specifications
- Polyphony: Monophonic
- Oscillator: Complex oscillator
- Synthesis type: West-coast style additive synthesis
- Filter: Low Pass Gates
- Attenuator: Function generators
- Effects: Space out (reverb)

Input/output
- Keyboard: Touchplate
- External control: CV input (Note: The Volca Modular does not support the Eurorack voltage standards.)

The Volca Modular is an analogue synthesizer (Note: With the exception of the Space Out module.) manufactured by the Japanese music technology company Korg. It is part of their popular Volca series of affordable electronic synthesizers and drum machines. Like other Volcas, it sports a 16-step sequencer and can be powered by batteries.

The Volca Modular is a semi-modular synthesizer, with patching being available to create new sounds. (Note: Being a semi-modular synthesizer, the Volca Modular has a default signal path that patching alters.) It was released in 2019 and is still in production, retailing for around £140.

== Release ==
=== Leaks ===
Volca Modular was released ahead Winter NAMM in February 2019, although information and pictures were leaked in December 2018. The news spread throughout online forums throughout the time before the official release.

=== Reception ===
The Volca Modular was unique at its launch, filling a niche in the market as an affordable modular synthesizer. It was received quite highly by music technology reviewers but received criticism for its cramped interface due to size and easily damageable DuPont patch cables.

==== Review scorings ====
- 4.5/5 MusicRadar
- 8/10 Engadget
- 9/10 MusicTech Choice Award

== Design ==
=== Inspiration ===
The Volca Modular was inspired by the "West Coast" design of synthesizers, produced by the likes of Don Buchla and Serge Tcherepnin in the 60s and 70s. West Coast synthesizers were based around the idea of adding harmonics to simple waveforms using complex oscillator cores and wavefolding, unlike the filtering of high harmonic waves used by the contemporary "East Coast" pioneer Robert Moog.

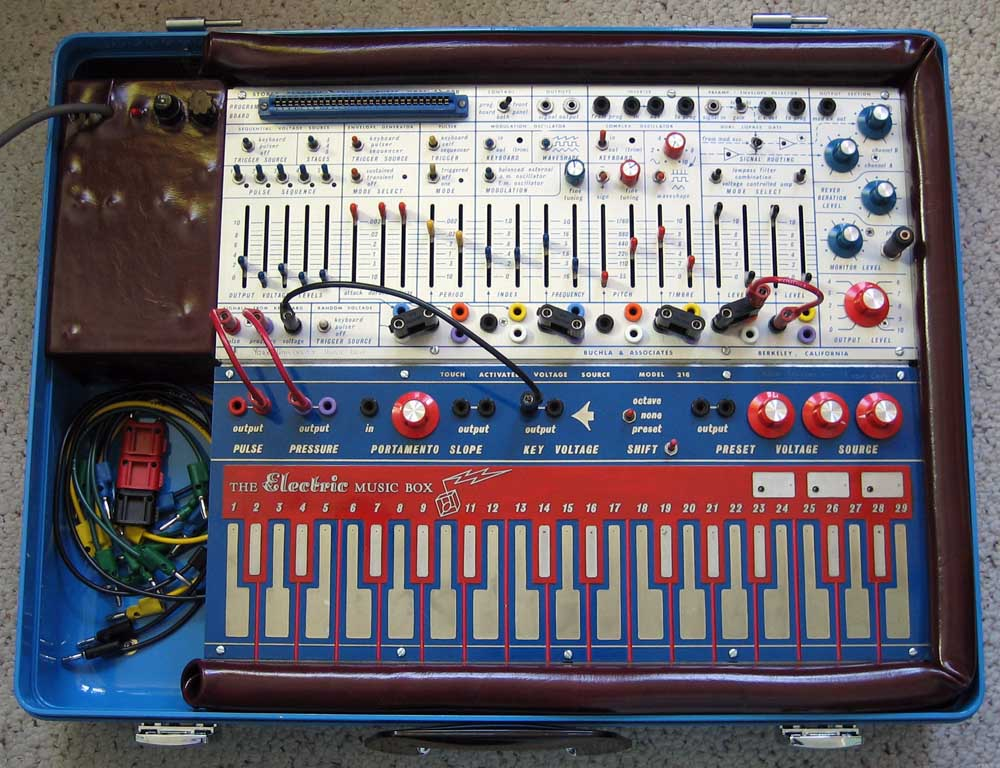
The Music Easel, an inspiration to the Volca Modular

The Volca Modular's colour palette is also inspired by the Serge-Buchla synthesizers, with their iconic red, white and blue livery.

Of all the Serge-Buchla synthesizers, the Volca Modular is most similar to the Buchla Music Easel in terms of modules and capabilities. It features a triangle-wave based complex oscillator core, dual low pass gates, function generators and a source of uncertainty (Sample and hold).

=== Patching ===
Patching on the Volca Modular is done through DuPont jumper cables (of which 20 are supplied). There are 50 patch points available for use. Light coloured patch points are inputs and darker coloured patch points are outputs. Audio signals and voltages are interchangeable, with the Korg stating that the maximum voltage limits are -3.3V to +3.3V for bipolar sources and 0V to 3.3V for unipolar sources. However, independent research indicates that the Volca Modular is able to handle to 9V signals.

== Modules ==
The Volca Modular has of 8 distinct modules, with a total of 50 patch points (Note: 24 inputs, 26 outputs.) available to be connected:

=== Main signal path ===
==== Oscillators ====
The oscillator section contains a two VCOs that can only produce a triangle wave. The oscillators are set up in a modulator-carrier relationship to perform FM synthesis. The modulator is usually silent (though it can be heard through patching) and its pitch is determined by a ratio to the carrier pitch, controlled by the RATIO knob. The depth of frequency modulation is controlled by the MOD knob.

The oscillator section also has a wavefolder, which adds additional harmonics to the complex oscillator by folding the waveform multiple times. The amount of wavefolding is controlled by the FOLD knob.

==== Low pass gates ====
The Volca Modular's dual low pass gates (LPGs) are a cross between a Voltage Controlled Amplifier (VCA) and a Voltage Controlled Filter (VCF). This gives the Volca Modular a distinctly natural sound, with sounds becoming both brighter and louder as cutoff increases. Unlike a typical VCF, they do not have resonance and are unable to self-oscillate. The only control for the LPGs is the CUTOFF knob, which controls the cutoff of each LPG individually.

==== Space out ====
Space out is a digital reverb, the only digital part of the Volca Modular. It is distinctly digital and cold but, according to MusicRadar "without it, the Volca Modular can sound dry and lifeless". Its only control is the AMOUNT knob, which controls the wet/dry signal mix.

=== Modulators and utilities ===
==== Function generators ====
The Volca Modular has 2 function generators, each behaving slightly differently. The first function generator is an attack-hold-release envelope (AHR as opposed to the more standardized ADSR). The attack and decay stages are both exponential curves, with the attack being inverted. The ASR envelope's has two knobs for hands-on control of the ATTACK and RELEASE.

The other function generator on the Volca Modular is ramp shaped, with no control over the individual portions of the envelope. The shape of this generator goes between a sawtooth, blended towards a triangle and then to a reverse sawtooth, or ramp. This blend is controlled by the SHAPE knob. There is also control of the time the generator takes from start to finish via the TIME knob. Using patching, this function generator can be made to function like a standard LFO.

==== Utility ====
The Utility module uses two simple equations to attenuate and mix signals: a+b*c and a-b*c (where c is the knob marked "c"). This can be used in many ways, including as a rudimentary method of summation or a basic ring modulator.

==== Woggle ====
The "Woggle" on the Volca Modular is a sample and hold circuit, which provides random values via sampling pink noise. It has both smoothed and stepped outputs. The internal pink noise sampling can be overridden, allowing you to sample any output of the Volca Modular.

==== Mult/Split ====
The split module is a utility that allows you to a turn one signal into two identical copies, useful for when you want to route a modulator to multiple destinations. There are two independent signal splitters.

==== Clock divider ====
The Volca Modular's clock divider section gives out trigger pulses in divisions of the tempo of the sequencer (tempo is controlled by the TEMPO knob). Divisions of every fourth, third and second are available, as well as a general gate output.

== See also ==
- Modular synthesizer
- Buchla Electronic Musical Instruments
- List of Korg products
