= Cakewalk (sequencer) =

Music sequencer software

- Version 5.0 for MS-DOS
- Developer: Twelve Tone Systems
- Initial release: 1987; 39 years ago
- Stable release: 9.03
- Operating system: Windows, MS-DOS
- Type: Host/Music sequencer
- License: Proprietary
- Website: cakewalk.com

Cakewalk is a sequencer first developed by Twelve Tone Systems (the company later known as Cakewalk, Inc.).

Originally for MS-DOS, starting with version Cakewalk 1.0 in 1987, and, beginning in 1991, for Windows 3.0. Until version 4.0 it required an MPU-401 MIDI interface card operating in intelligent mode, while 4.0 and later versions relied on the dumb UART mode only.

Cakewalk was delivered in two versions, Cakewalk Pro and Cakewalk Express. The latter was a lite version limited to 25 tracks and 1 MIDI output port. The Express version was sometimes bundled with hardware such as a sound card. Cakewalk was a purely MIDI based sequencer: Although it could trigger WAV files at certain points, more comprehensive audio support was not incorporated until the advent of Cakewalk Pro Audio when true support for digitized audio was added.

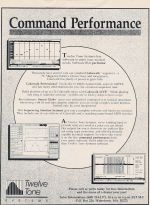
Cakewalk Professional 1.0 for MS-DOS

== Features ==
The last version of the product featured a piano roll editor, support for limited music notation and a built-in scripting language called CAL (Cakewalk Application Language). Cakewalk was a predecessor of SONAR which had nearly all of the same features, including support for CAL, and was the only major DAW on the market supporting a scripting language.

Cakewalk had piano roll and CAL support since the Windows 16-bit Version 3.01.

Cakewalk 3.01 showing limited WAV file support.

Cakewalk 3.01 showing Piano Roll, Staff and CAL windows.

== See also ==
- Cakewalk (company)
- List of music software
- Cakewalk Sonar
- Cakewalk by BandLab
