= Kake =

Kake may refer to:

- Kake, Alaska
- Kake, Hiroshima
- Kake (comics), a comic book series and fictional character created by Tom of Finland
- KAKE (TV), channel 10 serving Wichita, Kansas (and most of the state's outlying areas)
- Communist Archio-Marxist Party of Greece or KAKE, a political party in Greece

== People with the surname ==
- Jade Kake, New Zealand Māori architect and architectural designer
- Patrick Kake, New Zealand actor

== See also ==
- Cake (disambiguation)
