= Korg Volca =

Series of electronic musical instruments

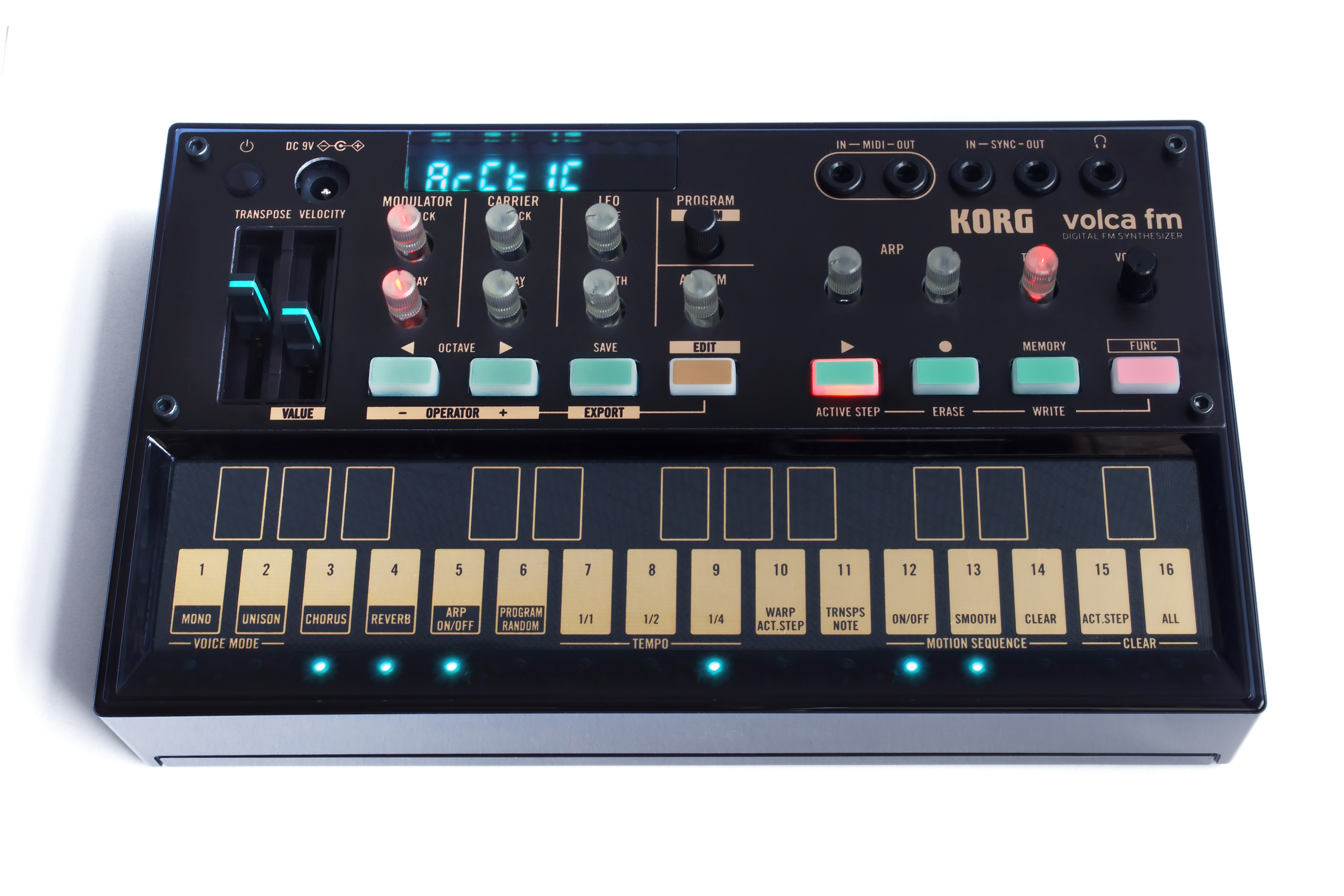
A Korg Volca FM synthesiser (second-generation version)

Korg Volca (stylised as volca) is a series of electronic musical instruments and accessories released by the Japanese manufacturer Korg. The various units in the range are noted for their inexpensive price and compact dimensions.

The series bridges both digital and analogue synthesis; synthesisers and drum machines, with many different types of noise generation represented in the 10 models available as of January 2024.

The range was initially launched in 2013 with the Volca Keys, Volca Beats and Volca Bass, all initially at £119.99 each. These models all featured MIDI-in for external control, as do most of the later releases with the exception of the Volca Modular.

== Models ==
=== Current ===
As of January 2024 the range includes:

- Volca Bass - Analogue synthesiser intended for bass sounds
- Volca Nubass - Vacuum tube-based analogue synthesiser designed for acid-style bass sounds
- Volca Beats - Hybrid rhythm machine with analog and digital sound source
- Volca Drum - Digital percussion synthesiser
- Volca FM (second generation, AKA "fm2" and "next-gen volca fm") - Polyphonic digital synthesiser based around FM synthesis with 6 operators, 6 voice polyphony and 32 algorithms. Promoted as able to reproduce the sound of the Yamaha DX7 and completely compatible with DX-7 SYS-EX patches.
- Volca Keys - Analogue loop synthesiser
- Volca Kick - Analogue kick generator for kick drums and kick basses
- Volca Mix - Four channel analogue mixer featuring a built-in speaker
- Volca Modular - Semi-modular analogue synthesiser
- Volca Sample (second generation, AKA "sample2") - Sample sequencer. (Slightly upgraded replacement for the original Volca Sample).

=== Other ===
As of January 2024, the following models are no longer listed in the current lineup at the Korg Volca website.

- Volca FM (first generation) - Polyphonic digital synthesiser based around FM synthesis with 6 operators and 3 voices polyphony, and 32 algorithms based on the Yamaha DX7's engine.
- Volca Sample (first generation) - Sample sequencer. (Superseded by second generation Volca Sample/Sample2)
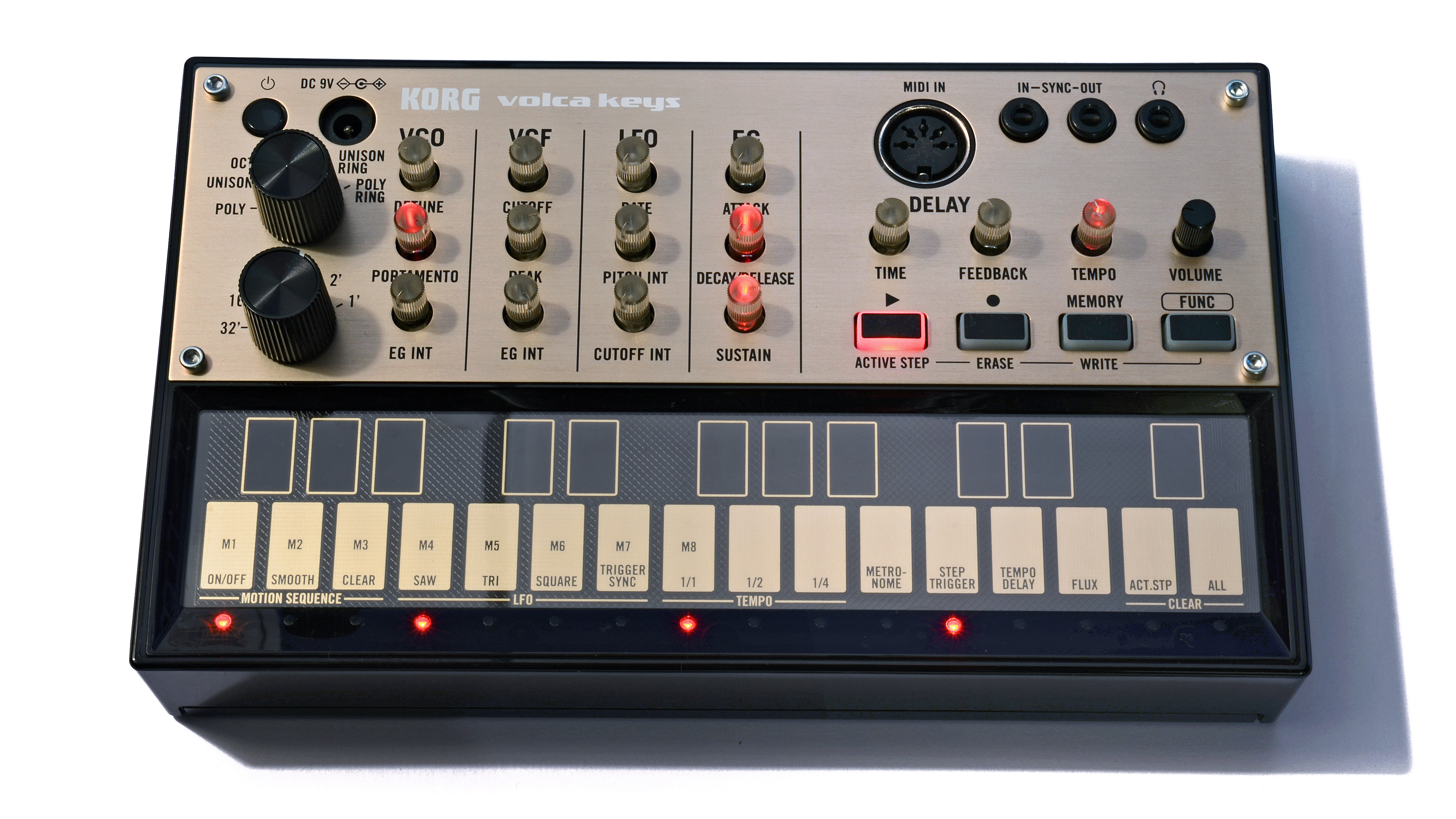
Volca Keys

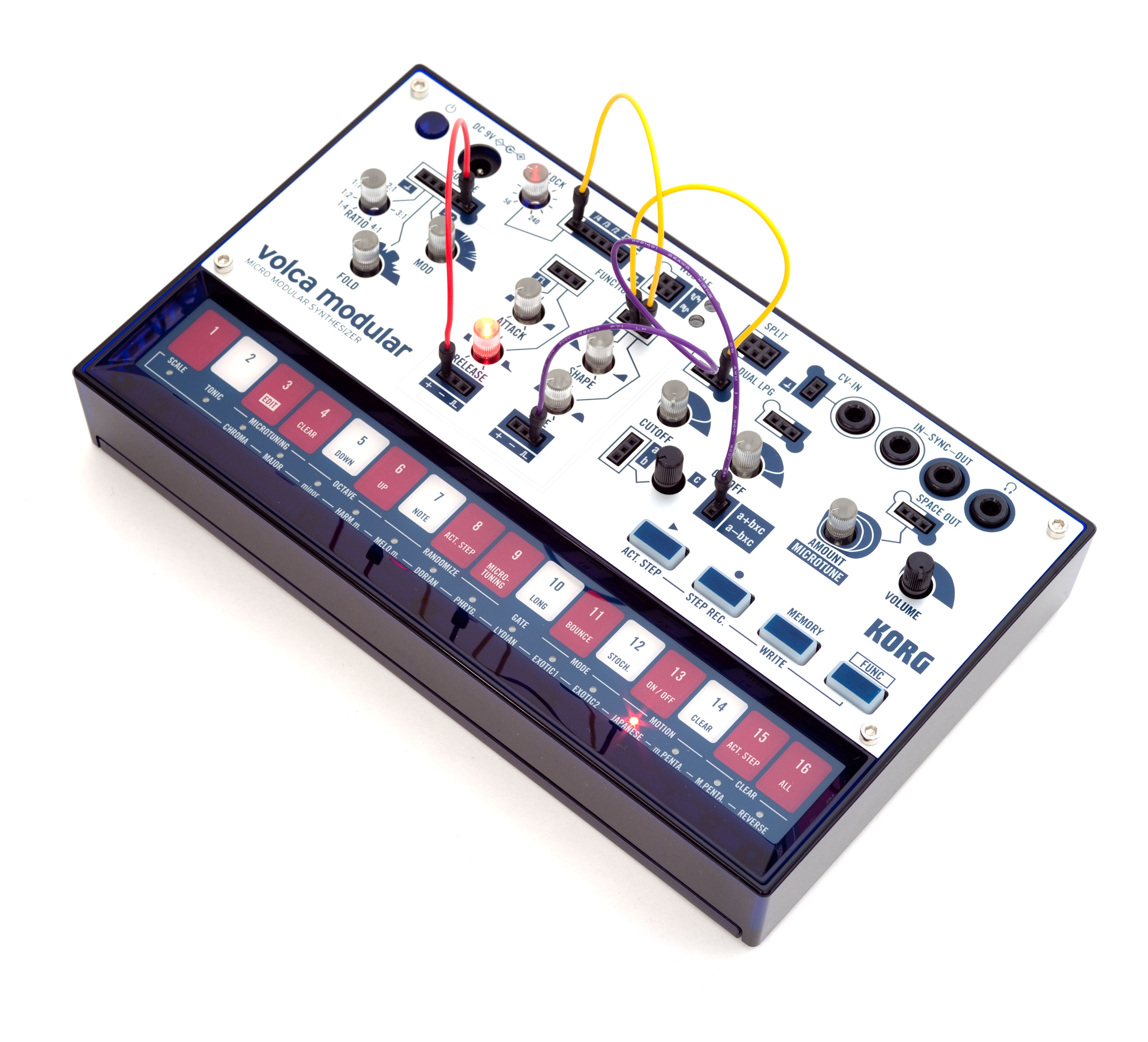
Volca Modular

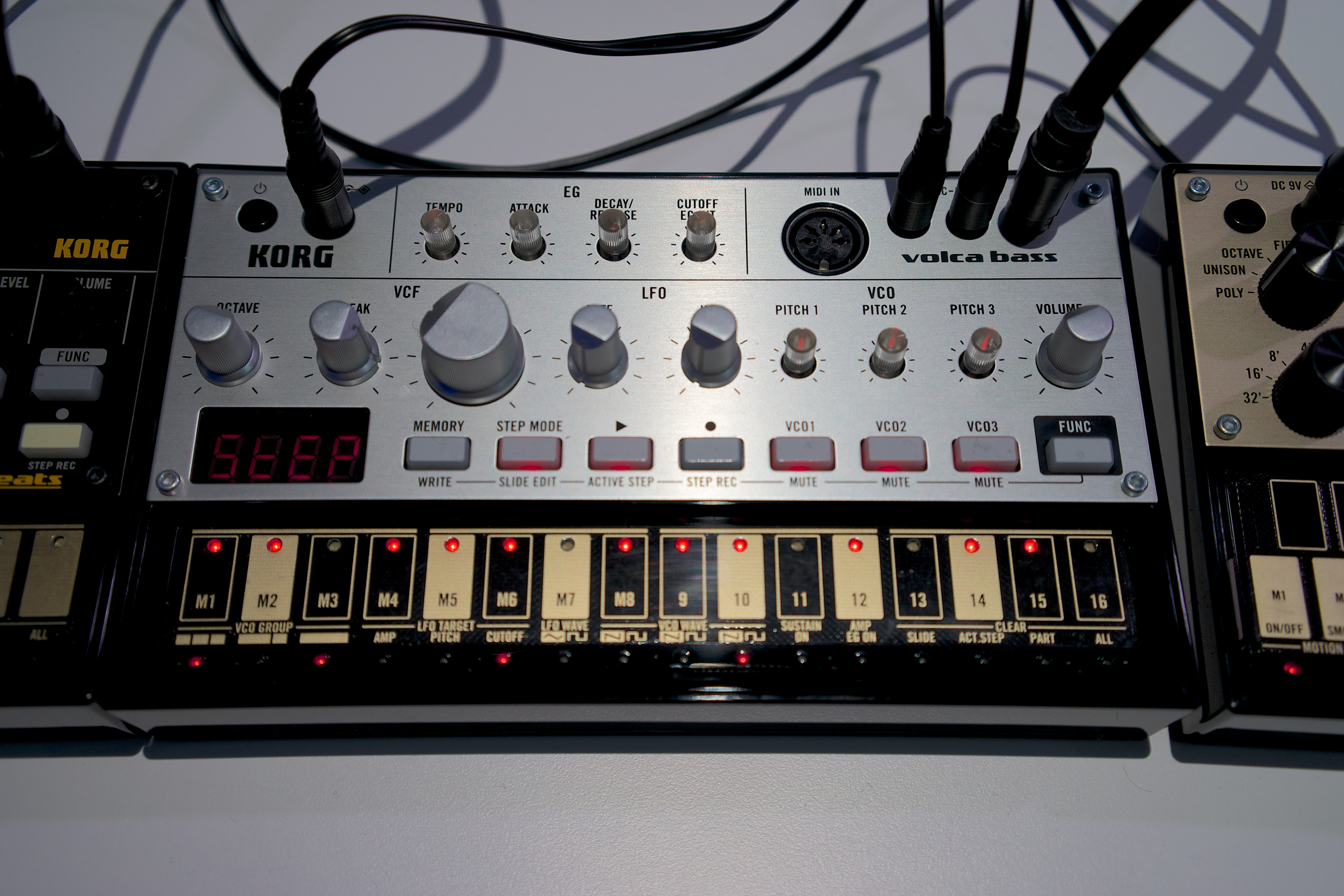
Korg Volca Bass

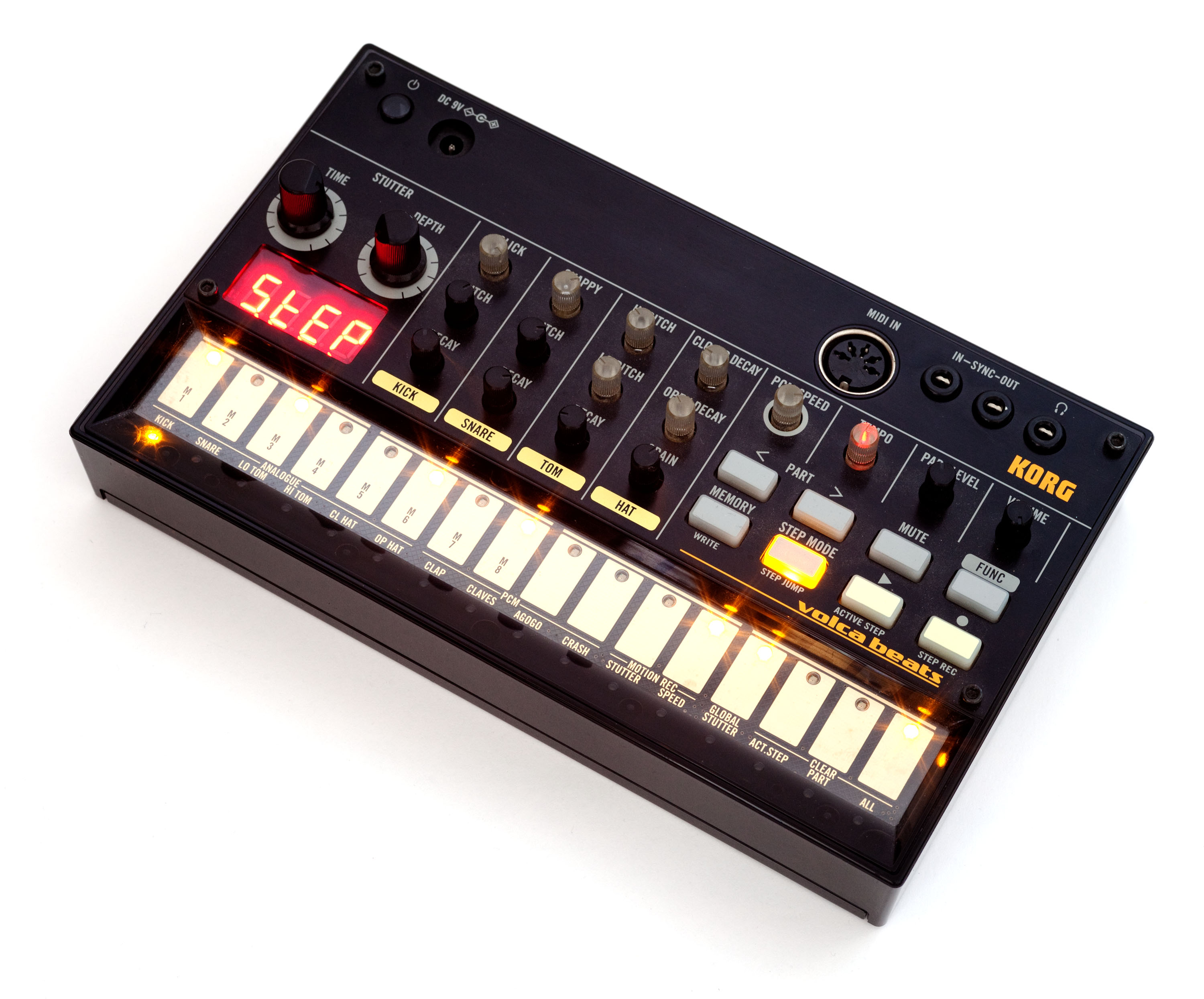
Volca Beats

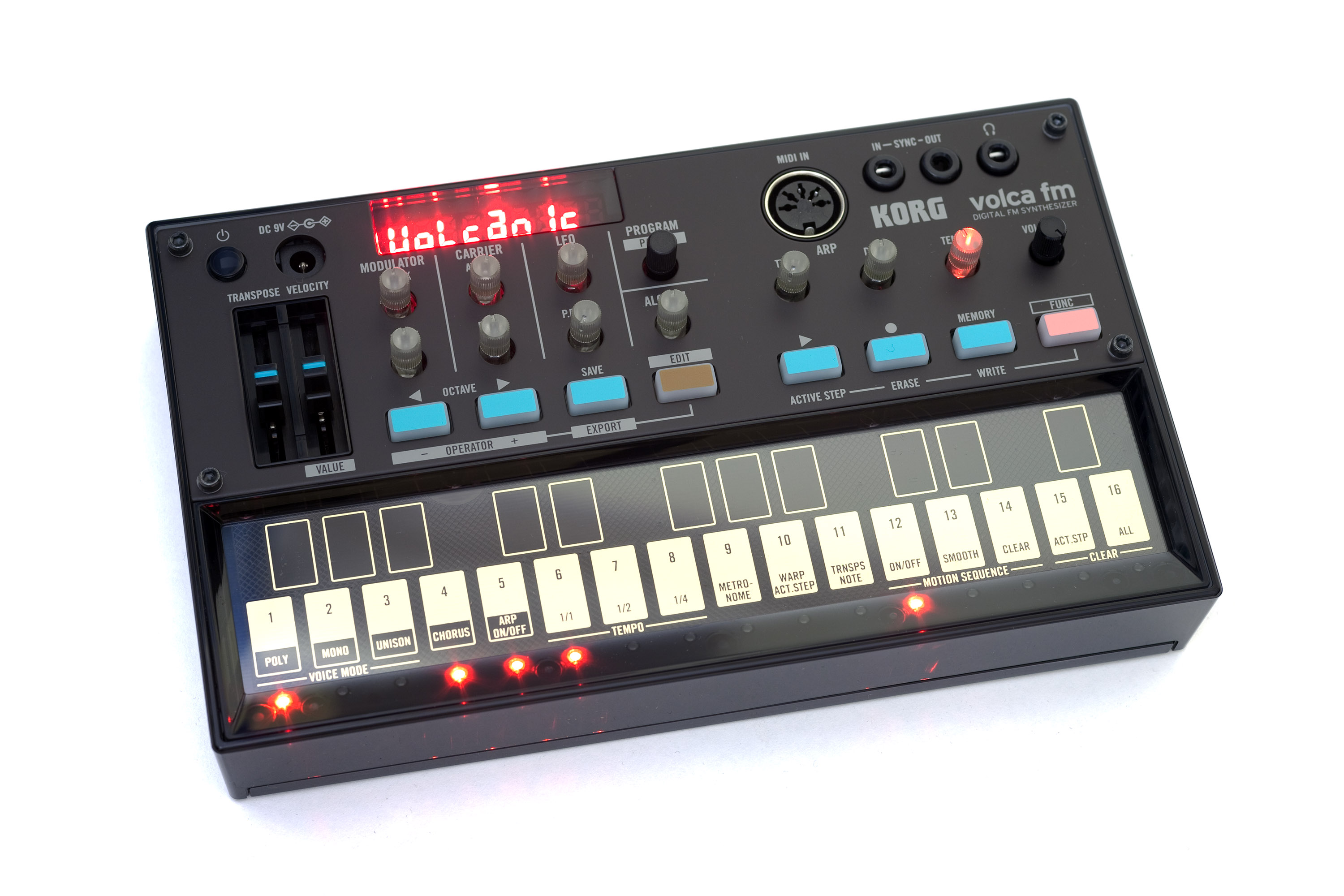
First-generation Volca FM

Korg Volca Keys looped sequence demo. Further effects/adjustments were applied live during playback using only the built-in controls and no further processing.

Korg Volca FM 2nd Gen Demo, demonstrating patches transferred from the original Yamaha DX7- "E.PIANO 1", "KOTO", "TUB BELLS" and "BASS 1"
