= POW-R =

Set of commercial dithering and noise shaping algorithms

The POW-R Consortium
- Company type: Limited liability company
- Industry: Digital Audio Engineering
- Founded: 1997
- Key people: John La Grou, Chairman / Daniel Weiss / Glenn Zelniker
- Products: Dithering algorithms (by license)
- Revenue: private company
- Website: https://www.mil-media.com/index.html

POW-R (Psychoacoustically Optimized Wordlength Reduction) is a set of commercial dithering and noise shaping algorithms used in digital audio bit-depth reduction. Developed by a consortium of four companies – The POW-R Consortium – the algorithms were first made available in 1999 in digital audio hardware products. POW-R is now licensed for use by many companies, particularly those in the digital audio workstation (DAW) arena, where it currently has significant market share.

== History ==
POW-R was developed between 1997 and 1998 after an unfavorable change in the licensing terms of a leading bit-depth reduction algorithm of the time prompted some of its licensees to put together a consortium to develop a viable alternative algorithm.

Formed by four audio engineering companies: Lake Technology (Dolby Labs), Weiss Engineering, Millennia Media and Z-Systems, the consortium set out with the goal to create 'the most sonically transparent dithering algorithm possible'.

In 1999, the first products containing POW-R were released by consortium companies. Other companies became interested in using POW-R in their products, and the algorithms are now licensed to a number of leading DAW vendors including Apple, Avid (Digidesign), Sonic Studio, Ableton, Magix / Sequoia / Samplitude, and others.

== Reception ==
One of the first products to include POW-R was a hardware dithering unit from Weiss engineering; in a review of this product in 1999, mastering engineer Bob Katz spoke highly of the new algorithm declaring it 'an incredible achievement'.

== Technical details ==
Technically, the entire POW-R suite is not noise shaping; rather, the original POW-R algorithm is based on narrow-band Nyquist dither, while other POW-R algorithms include noise shaping and white noise. Unlike noise-shaping algorithms based on an ‘Absolute threshold of hearing’ model (i.e. the quietest sound that can be heard on otherwise silent conditions), POW-R has been designed to give optimal performance at normal listening levels. Here, optimal performance means maximizing the apparent dynamic range of the resultant signal while simultaneously minimizing the audible effects of the dither and quantization noise which, if this is not achieved, are typically tonal in nature.

Since noise audibility depends on the nature of the audio being processed, the POW-R algorithm is made available in three variants, optimized respectively for simple program such as spoken word, limited dynamic range program such as rock music, and wide dynamic range program such as orchestral music. Each algorithm moves the noise to those frequencies where its audible effect for the particular audio type is minimized. The graph to the right shows the frequency response of the orchestral music algorithm variant (POW-R3, a 9th order filter).

== See also ==
- Dithering
- Audio mastering
- Noise shaping
