= Cakewalk (company) =

American music software company

Cakewalk, Inc.
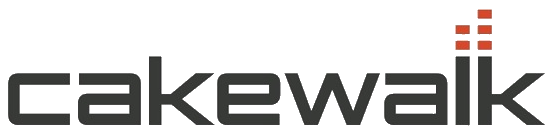
- Formerly: Twelve Tone Systems, Inc.
- Type: Private (1987–2012); Subsidiary (2013–18); Brand (2018–)
- Industry: Software
- Founded: 1987; 39 years ago
- Founder: Greg Hendershott
- Fate: Company defunct; currently a brand of BandLab Technologies
- Successor: BandLab Technologies
- Headquarters: Boston, Massachusetts, United States
- Area served: Worldwide
- Products: SONAR; Music software
- Owner: BandLab Technologies
- Parent: Roland Corporation (majority owner, 2008-2013); Gibson (2013–18)

Cakewalk, Inc. is a former music production software company based in Boston, Massachusetts and currently a brand of Singaporean music company BandLab Technologies. The company's best known product was their professional-level digital audio workstation (DAW) software, SONAR. SONAR integrated multi-track recording and editing of digital audio and MIDI. The company also offered a full range of music software products, including Pyro Audio Creator—a digital music management program, and Dimension Pro—a virtual instrument.

The brand was acquired in 2013 by Gibson, and in 2017 Gibson announced it was ceasing Cakewalk development. In 2018, Singapore-based BandLab Technologies purchased some of Cakewalk, Inc.'s assets, and continued SONAR development as part of its portfolio of freeware digital audio workstation software.

== History ==
Greg Hendershott founded the company in 1987 as Twelve Tone Systems, Inc., and was its CEO until July 1, 2012. The firm soon found that most customers referred to it by the name of its initial product, a MIDI music sequencer that Hendershott had named Cakewalk. To avoid confusion, the company operated for many years as "Twelve Tone Systems, Inc. DBA Cakewalk".

The company released the original MIDI music sequencer product, Cakewalk, for MS-DOS in 1987. In 1991, they released a version for Windows 3.0.

Early Cakewalk for DOS versions (up to 3.0) required the intelligent mode of the MPU-401, and so could not be used with product clones of the MPU-401, while later Cakewalk versions (since 4.0) relied on the "dumb" UART mode only. With the addition of more features, the company renamed the sequencer Cakewalk Pro, and then Cakewalk Pro Audio when it gained support for digitized audio.

The SONAR digital audio workstation provided users the ability to create projects in which they could edit digital audio tracks, MIDI tracks, and associated information like lyrics and music notation. SONAR's visual displays included audio waveforms, musical scores, editing consoles, and event lists. The user could mix MIDI output and audio tracks down to a stereo .WAV file and burn it to a CD or publish it in other media formats.

In January 2008, the logo on the company's products changed to "Cakewalk by Roland" to reflect Roland Corporation's purchase of a majority interest in the company.

In September 2008, the company officially changed its corporate name to 'Cakewalk, Inc.'

Effective July 1, 2012, Greg Hendershott resigned as CEO, after 25 years with the company. Michael Hoover, previously Executive Vice President of Products, became President of Cakewalk, Inc.

On December 6, 2013, Roland sold all of its shares of Cakewalk to Gibson Brands. For the next 4 years, Cakewalk continued to operate in Boston, developing products for the Cakewalk brand, along with joint products with TASCAM.

On November 17, 2017, Gibson announced that it was ceasing active development and production of Cakewalk branded products. After 30 years, Cakewalk, Inc. ceased operation, with only the company's web forum and license authorization servers still being kept functional.

On February 23, 2018, Singapore-based BandLab Technologies announced its purchase of some of Cakewalk, Inc.’s assets and all of its intellectual property. BandLab's stated goal was continued development of the former company's flagship product, SONAR (now renamed Cakewalk by BandLab) as part of its portfolio of freeware digital audio workstation software.

== Products ==
The company's products included sequencers; digital audio workstations, including the current Cakewalk by Bandlab, and former products Dimension Pro and Rapture Pro (Multisample synth); and instruments, effects tools and miscellaneous consumer products for creating music.

== See also ==
- List of music software
