= Cakewalk by BandLab =

Digital audio workstation

- Original author: Cakewalk, Inc.
- Developer: BandLab Technologies
- Release: April 4, 2018; 8 years ago
- Stable release: 2024.02 / February 22, 2024; 2 years ago
- Operating system: Windows
- Available in: 9 languages: English, German, French, Spanish, Italian, Japanese, Chinese, Portuguese, Russian
- Type: Digital audio workstation, Music sequencer
- License: Proprietary
- Website: www.bandlab.com/products/cakewalk

Cakewalk is a full-featured digital audio workstation software package for audio and MIDI composing, recording, arranging, editing, mixing and mastering. It is developed and published under a free subscription licensing model by BandLab Technologies of Singapore for the Microsoft Windows platform.

== Lineage ==
Sonar was the final flagship product of Cakewalk, Inc. of Boston, Massachusetts. After 30 years of operation, Cakewalk, Inc. was dissolved in November 2017 by its parent company, Gibson Brands. At this time, Gibson ceased all development and support of Cakewalk software with only the licensing and support forum servers kept running.

In February 2018, BandLab Technologies announced that it had purchased all of Cakewalk, Inc.’s intellectual property and some of its assets. BandLab's stated goal was continued development of the former company's flagship product, SONAR (now renamed Cakewalk by BandLab) as part of its portfolio of freeware digital audio workstation software. BandLab continues to maintain the old Cakewalk, Inc. licensing servers as a courtesy to owners of legacy products.

== History ==
In addition to acquiring the intellectual property from Cakewalk, Inc., BandLab also hired former CTO Noel Borthwick and Senior Software Engineer Ben Staton (among other former Cakewalk staff) to continue development of the code.

The current Cakewalk by BandLab is descended directly from the SONAR code base as acquired by BandLab.

The first release of Cakewalk by BandLab was on April 4, 2018 and was restricted to bug fixes planned for SONAR, as well as string and art changes to reflect the name change from SONAR to Cakewalk by BandLab. It was followed by monthly bug fixes and stability updates, and by the fourth release new features began to be added. With each release, new features have continued to be added.

In June of 2023, BandLab announced that it would be discontinuing Cakewalk by BandLab, and it would be replaced by a redesigned and updated version that would see the return of the Sonar name, and would no longer be a free product.

License renewals for Cakewalk by BandLab ceased in August 2025.

== Licensing ==
Cakewalk by BandLab is licensed via free subscription. In order to download and install the package and add-ons (which include the Cakewalk Studio Instruments bundle, Cakewalk Theme Editor, and a trial version of Celemony Melodyne), the user must first create an account at BandLab’s website, then download and run either the web installer or BandLab Assistant. Either of these will download and install Cakewalk by BandLab and the optional add-ons. After this, the license must be validated at least once every six months through an Internet connection or it will revert to “demo mode” and project saving will be disabled until it can be validated again. Offline validation is also possible via use of BandLab Assistant and a second computer system that is connected to the Internet.

== See also ==
- Comparison of digital audio editors
- List of music software
- List of MIDI editors and sequencers
