= BandLab Technologies =

Singaporean multi-brand music company

- Type: Private
- Industry: Music collaboration software; Instruments and accessories; Music publications
- Founded: 2015; 11 years ago
- Founders: Kuok Meng Ru; Steve Skillings
- Headquarters: Singapore
- Key people: Kuok Meng Ru (CEO)
- Products: BandLab; Cakewalk by BandLab; Guitar.com; Harmony Company; Heritage Guitars; lab.fm; MONO; MusicTech; NME; Swee Lee; Teisco; The Guitar Magazine; Uncut
- Website: bandlabtechnologies.com

BandLab Technologies is a Singaporean company founded in 2015 that operates a social music platform, called BandLab, and also owns a variety of music-related brands, including Harmony and Heritage Guitars; media platforms Guitar.com, NME, Uncut and MusicTech.com; and musical instrument retailer and distributor Swee Lee.

In December 2021, the company announced a reorganisation under the newly formed parent company Caldecott Music Group (CMG). BandLab Technologies is the music technology division of CMG.

== History ==
BandLab Technologies was founded in 2015 by Kuok Meng Ru and Steve Skillings. Kuok is also the owner of music retailer Swee Lee, acquired in 2012. BandLab Technologies' first product, a cloud digital audio workstation (DAW) called BandLab, was released in November 2015.

In July 2016, the company acquired Composr, an iOS app for recording audio and making music. In September, the company acquired MONO Creators Inc, an American manufacturer of instrument cases, straps and accessories. Also in September, BandLab Technologies acquired 49% of American music magazine Rolling Stone from publisher Wenner Media.

In September 2017, the company acquired Chew.tv, a video streaming service for DJs. In November, the company announced it was relaunching the Harmony Company guitar and Teisco musical instrument brand names.

In February 2018, BandLab Technologies acquired DAW Sonar from musical instrument company Gibson, after Gibson acquired and closed Sonar's developer, parent Cakewalk. Sonar was renamed Cakewalk by BandLab. In October, the company acquired brands The Guitar Magazine and MusicTech from UK-based publisher Anthem Publishing.

In January 2019, BandLab Technologies sold its 49% stake in Rolling Stone to American publishing company Penske Media. In May, the company bought the music publications NME and Uncut from United Kingdom publisher TI Media. In August, the company announced that it was integrating its livestreaming service Chew into BandLab and renaming it as BandLab Live.

In July 2020, the company released BandLab Albums, software for digital distribution for independent artists.

In November 2021, BandLab acquired DIY artist services platform ReverbNation for an undisclosed sum.

In December 2021, the company announced a new parent company, Caldecott Music Group. Caldecott Music Group (CMG) oversees three divisions: BandLab Technologies (technology and software), NME Networks (media), and Vista Musical Instruments (manufacturing, retail, and distribution).

In February 2023, it was announced BandLab had acquired the beat marketplace company, Airbit.

== Brands ==
Brands within the BandLab Technologies division of CMG:

- BandLab – a free online (cloud) digital audio workstation (DAW) tool for creating music and collaborating with other musicians. It works in a browser or with a standalone app. BandLab includes BandLab Albums, a digital distribution tool for musicians. The tool also includes BandLab Live, a livestreaming feature.
- Cakewalk – a DAW formerly known as Sonar.

Brands under NME Networks, a division of CMG (previously part of BandLab Technologies):

- lab.fm – an online music publication.
- MusicTech – an online music technology publication.

Brands under Vista Musical Instruments, CMG (previously part of BandLab Technologies):

- Heritage Guitars – a United States–based guitar manufacturer.
- MONO – a manufacturer of instrument cases, straps and accessories.
- Teisco – a brand of musical effects pedals.
- Swee Lee – a Southeast Asian musical instrument distributor and retailer.

== Business model ==
BandLab Technologies does not charge for its software or digital musical content, but instead focuses on retail, manufacturing and media advertising sales.
