= Musikmesse Frankfurt =

International music-industry fair in Germany (1980–2019)

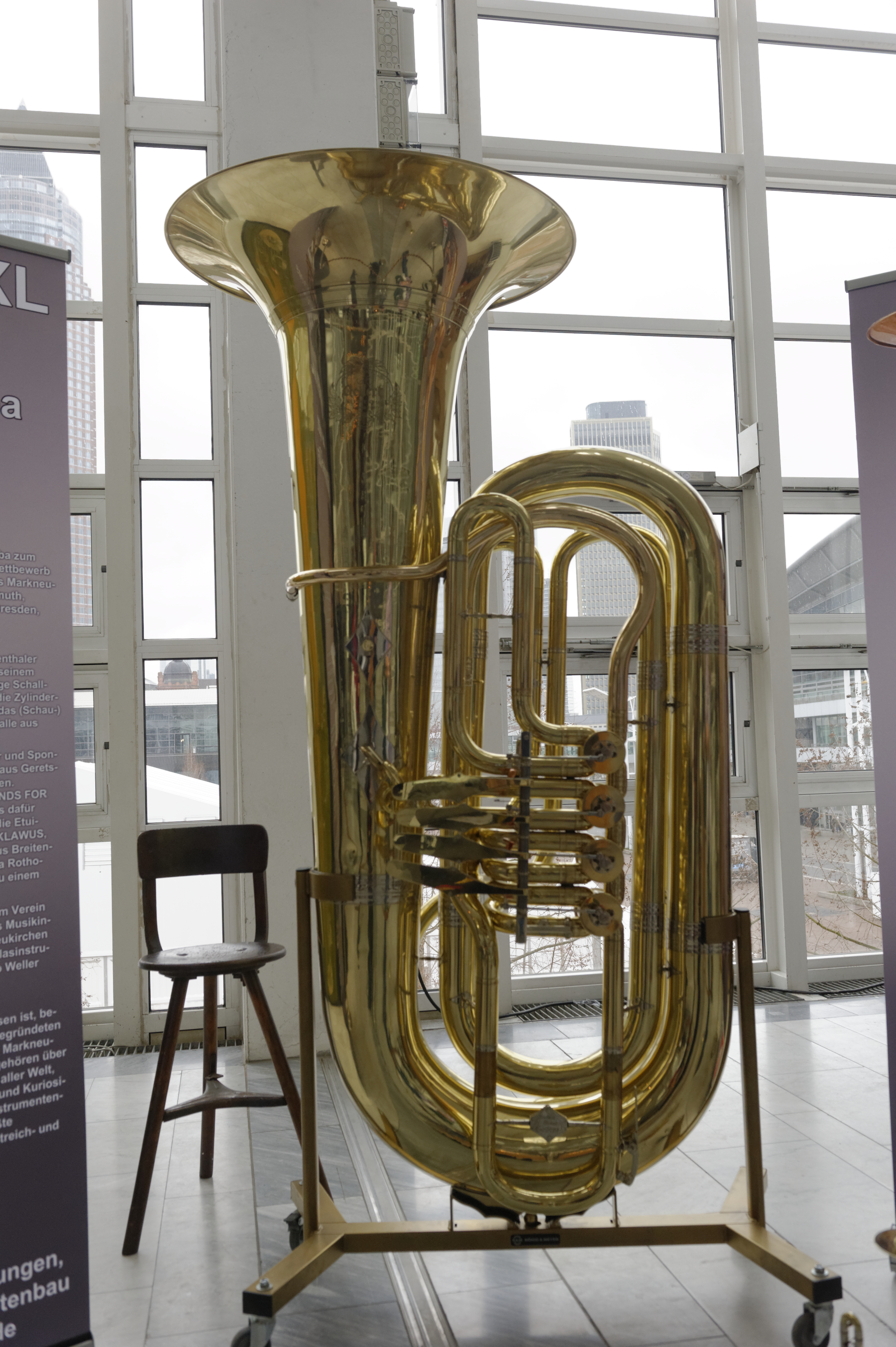
Giant tuba at the Musikmesse Frankfurt 2013, which was over 2 m high and weighed 50 kg

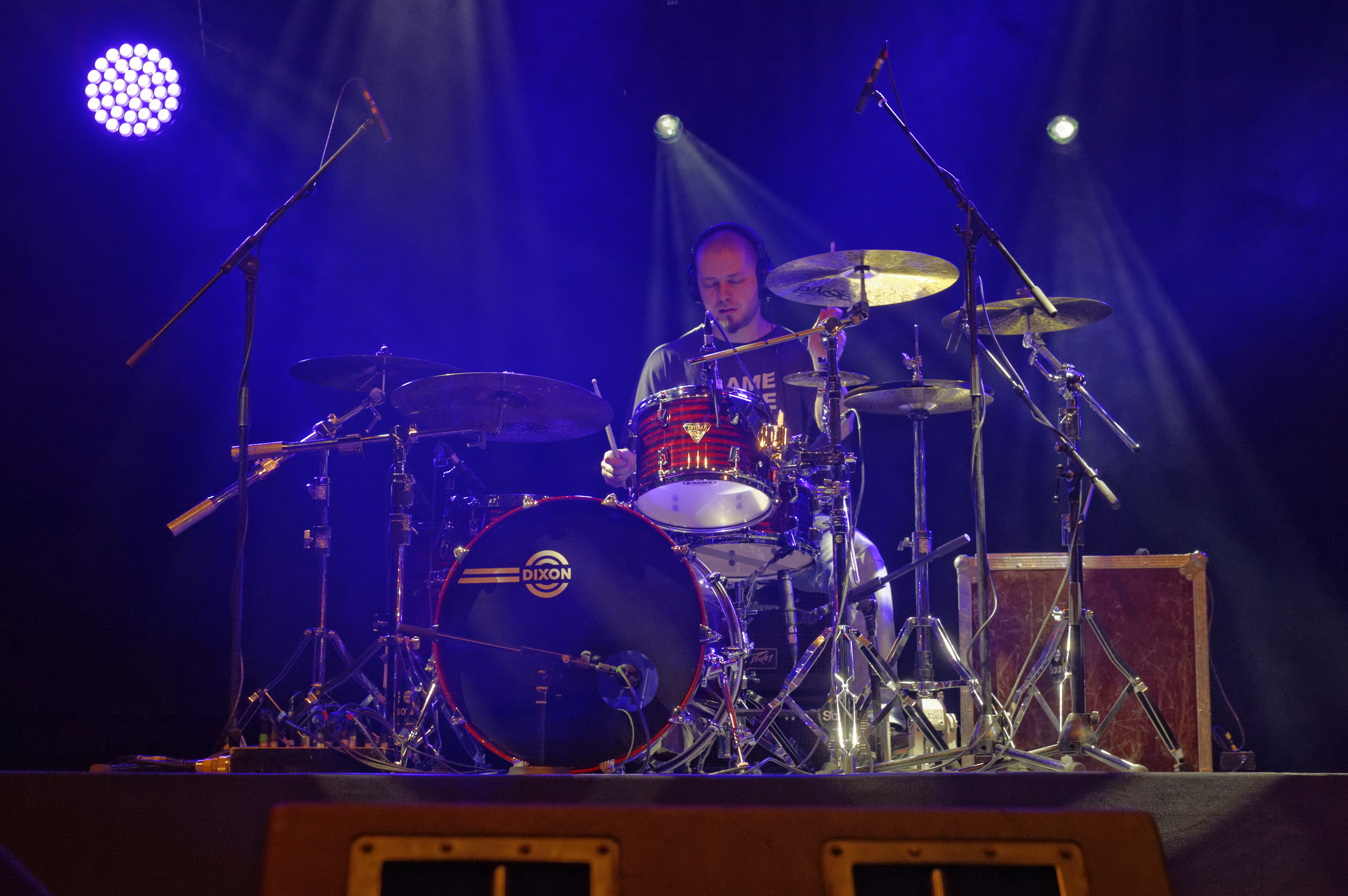
Musical program at the Agora Stage with Komme Bö

Musikmesse Frankfurt was an international trade show and music festival for the music products industry that took place annually in Frankfurt am Main, Germany from 1980 until 2019. At its peak, the fair was one of the largest international trade shows, with over 1,800 attendees from all around the world.

== History ==
The fair was first introduced in 1980. It is generally held in the first quarter of the year for four days. The first two days are reserved for the business audience, while the last two days are accessible for everyone.

In 2013, the fair was held from 10 to 13 April, with 68,587 visitors and 1,512 exhibitors from 51 countries in attendance. A playable and oversized tuba with a measure of 2,05 metres and weighing of 50 kg was displayed, which was first shown in 2012 in the musical instrument museum in Markneukirchen. Despite an exhibitor drop to 1,384 in 2013, the number of visitors went up to 70,863.

In 2016, the fair took place from 7 to 10 April. For the first time the Musikmesse Festival took place in the framework of the Musikmesse. It was spread over Frankfurt's pubs and provided musical entertainment.

The fair was canceled in 2020 due to the COVID-19 pandemic, and in 2021. and in 2022 its organizers announced that it would end the Musikmesse trade show and related local festivals.

== Award shows during the fair ==
- PRG LEA – Live Entertainment Award
- Frankfurter Musikpreis
- Deutscher Musikinstrumentenpreis
- Musikmesse International Press Award (MIPA)
- Deutscher Pianistenpreis
- Musikeditionspreis Best Edition
- PPVMEDIEN Leser-Awards
- Europäischer SchulmusikPreis 2013
- SchoolJam
- www.drums.de Musik Fach-Award

== Stages ==
On the main stage, the Agora Stage, a new act presents music or product demonstrations every thirty minutes on two levels every day. International artists perform music in all facets.
